= ATC code A03 =

Pharmaceutical drug classification

ATC code A03 Drugs for functional gastrointestinal disorders is a therapeutic subgroup of the Anatomical Therapeutic Chemical Classification System, a system of alphanumeric codes developed by the World Health Organization (WHO) for the classification of drugs and other medical products. Subgroup A03 is part of the anatomical group A Alimentary tract and metabolism.

Codes for veterinary use (ATCvet codes) can be created by placing the letter Q in front of the human ATC code: for example, QA03. ATCvet codes without corresponding human ATC codes are cited with the leading Q in the following list.
National versions of the ATC classification may include additional codes not present in this list, which follows the WHO version.

== A03A Drugs for functional gastrointestinal disorders ==
=== A03AA Synthetic anticholinergics, esters with tertiary amino group ===
A03AA01 Oxyphencyclimine
A03AA03 Camylofin
A03AA04 Mebeverine
A03AA05 Trimebutine
A03AA06 Rociverine
A03AA07 Dicycloverine
A03AA08 Dihexyverine
A03AA09 Difemerine
A03AA30 Piperidolate

=== A03AB Synthetic anticholinergics, quaternary ammonium compounds ===
A03AB01 Benzilone
A03AB02 Glycopyrronium bromide
A03AB03 Oxyphenonium
A03AB04 Penthienate
A03AB05 Propantheline
A03AB06 Otilonium bromide
A03AB07 Methantheline
A03AB08 Tridihexethyl
A03AB09 Isopropamide
A03AB10 Hexocyclium
A03AB11 Poldine
A03AB12 Mepenzolate
A03AB13 Bevonium
A03AB14 Pipenzolate
A03AB15 Diphemanil
A03AB16 (2-benzhydryloxyethyl)diethyl-methylammonium iodide
A03AB17 Tiemonium iodide
A03AB18 Prifinium bromide
A03AB19 Timepidium bromide
A03AB21 Fenpiverinium
A03AB53 Oxyphenonium, combinations
QA03AB90 Benzetimide
QA03AB92 Carbachol
QA03AB93 Neostigmin

=== A03AC Synthetic antispasmodics, amides with tertiary amines ===
A03AC02 Dimethylaminopropionylphenothiazine
A03AC04 Nicofetamide
A03AC05 Tiropramide

=== A03AD Papaverine and derivatives ===
A03AD01 Papaverine
A03AD02 Drotaverine
A03AD30 Moxaverine

=== A03AE Serotonin receptor antagonists ===
A03AE01 Alosetron
A03AE03 Cilansetron

=== A03AX Other drugs for functional gastrointestinal disorders ===
A03AX01 Fenpiprane
A03AX02 Diisopromine
A03AX03 Chlorbenzoxamine
A03AX04 Pinaverium
A03AX05 Fenoverine
A03AX06 Idanpramine
A03AX07 Proxazole
A03AX08 Alverine
A03AX09 Trepibutone
A03AX10 Isometheptene
A03AX11 Caroverine
A03AX12 Phloroglucinol
A03AX13 Silicones
A03AX14 Valethamate
A03AX15 Menthae piperitae aetheroleum
A03AX30 Trimethyldiphenylpropylamine
A03AX58 Alverine, combinations
QA03AX63 Silicones, combinations
QA03AX90 Physiostigmin
QA03AX91 Macrogol ricinoleat (NFN)

== A03B Belladonna and derivatives, plain ==
=== A03BA Belladonna alkaloids, tertiary amines ===
A03BA01 Atropine
A03BA03 Hyoscyamine
A03BA04 Belladonna total alkaloids

=== A03BB Belladonna alkaloids, semisynthetic, quaternary ammonium compounds ===
A03BB01 Butylscopolamine
A03BB02 Methylatropine
A03BB03 Methylscopolamine
A03BB04 Fentonium
A03BB05 Cimetropium bromide
A03BB06 Homatropine methylbromide

== A03C Antispasmodics in combination with psycholeptics ==
=== A03CA Synthetic anticholinergic agents in combination with psycholeptics ===
A03CA01 Isopropamide and psycholeptics
A03CA02 Clidinium and psycholeptics
A03CA03 Oxyphencyclimine and psycholeptics
A03CA04 Otilonium bromide and psycholeptics
A03CA05 Glycopyrronium and psycholeptics
A03CA06 Bevonium and psycholeptics
A03CA07 Ambutonium and psycholeptics
A03CA08 Diphemanil and psycholeptics
A03CA09 Pipenzolate and psycholeptics
A03CA30 Emepronium and psycholeptics
A03CA34 Propantheline and psycholeptics

=== A03CB Belladonna and derivatives in combination with psycholeptics ===
A03CB01 Methylscopolamine and psycholeptics
A03CB02 Belladonna total alkaloids and psycholeptics
A03CB03 Atropine and psycholeptics
A03CB04 Homatropine methylbromide and psycholeptics
A03CB31 Hyoscyamine and psycholeptics

== A03D Antispasmodics in combination with analgesics ==
=== A03DA Synthetic anticholinergic agents in combination with analgesics ===
A03DA01 Tropenzilone and analgesics
A03DA02 Pitofenone and analgesics
A03DA03 Bevonium and analgesics
A03DA04 Ciclonium and analgesics
A03DA05 Camylofin and analgesics
A03DA06 Trospium and analgesics
A03DA07 Tiemonium iodide and analgesics

=== A03DB Belladonna and derivatives in combination with analgesics ===
A03DB04 Butylscopolamine and analgesics

== A03F Propulsives ==
=== A03FA Propulsives ===
A03FA01 Metoclopramide
A03FA02 Cisapride
A03FA03 Domperidone
A03FA04 Bromopride
A03FA05 Alizapride
A03FA06 Clebopride
A03FA07 Itopride
A03FA08 Cinitapride
A03FA09 Mosapride
A03FA10 Acotiamide
QA03FA90 Physiostigmine
