= C21H26NO3 =

The molecular formula C_{21}H_{26}NO_{3} (molar mass: 340.44 g/mol, exact mass: 340.1913 u) may refer to:

- Mepenzolate
- Methantheline
- Poldine
