= C28H41N3O3 =

The molecular formula C_{28}H_{41}N_{3}O_{3} (molar mass: 467.643 g/mol, exact mass: 467.3148 u) may refer to:

- Oxetacaine
- Tiropramide
