= Trimethyldiphenylpropylamine =

Chemical compound

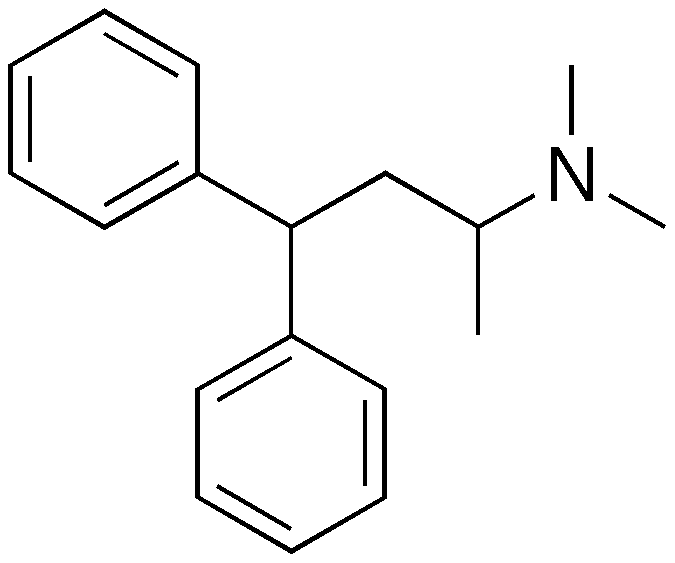

Clinical data
- ATC code: A03AX30 (WHO)

Identifiers
- IUPAC name: N,N-Dimethyl-4,4-di(phenyl)butan-2-amine
- CAS Number: 13957-55-6
- PubChem CID: 30966
- ChemSpider: 28729
- UNII: P4X899446U
- CompTox Dashboard (EPA): DTXSID801043073

Chemical and physical data
- Formula: C_{18}H_{23}N
- Molar mass: 253.389 g·mol^{−1}
- 3D model (JSmol): Interactive image
- SMILES: CC(CC(c1ccccc1)c2ccccc2)N(C)C
- InChI: InChI=1S/C18H23N/c1-15(19(2)3)14-18(16-10-6-4-7-11-16)17-12-8-5-9-13-17/h4-13,15,18H,14H2,1-3H3; Key:NSHMKXVHJBBKTN-UHFFFAOYSA-N

Trimethyldiphenylpropylamine, marketed under the trade name Recipavrin salts or mixtures — is an antispasmodic used to treat functional gastrointestinal disorders, it is a structural analogue of methadone.

== See also ==
- Emepronium
