= Hexocyclium =

Chemical compound

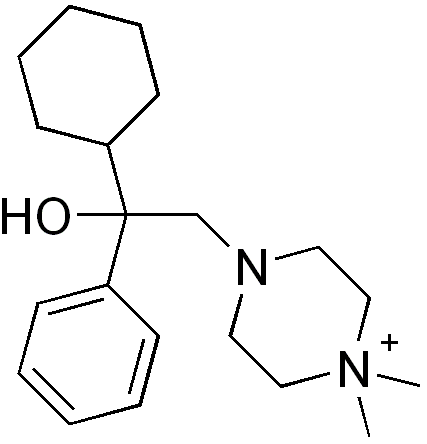

Clinical data
- ATC code: A03AB10 (WHO)

Identifiers
- IUPAC name: 4-(2-cyclohexyl-2-hydroxy-2-phenylethyl)-1,1-dimethylpiperazin-1-ium
- CAS Number: 6004-98-4
- PubChem CID: 24199
- IUPHAR/BPS: 323
- ChemSpider: 22621
- UNII: LL3147PI1T
- ChEMBL: ChEMBL1201325
- CompTox Dashboard (EPA): DTXSID80859210

Chemical and physical data
- Formula: C_{20}H_{33}N_{2}O
- Molar mass: 317.497 g·mol^{−1}
- 3D model (JSmol): Interactive image
- SMILES: C[N+]1(CCN(CC1)CC(C2CCCCC2)(C3=CC=CC=C3)O)C
- InChI: InChI=1S/C20H33N2O/c1-22(2)15-13-21(14-16-22)17-20(23,18-9-5-3-6-10-18)19-11-7-4-8-12-19/h3,5-6,9-10,19,23H,4,7-8,11-17H2,1-2H3/q+1; Key:ZRYHPQCHHOKSMD-UHFFFAOYSA-N

Hexocyclium is an antimuscarinic. It is used in the form of its methyl sulfate, called hexocyclium metilsulfate.
