= C20H25N =

The molecular formula C_{20}H_{25}N may refer to:

- Fenpiprane
- Prodipine
