= Diisopromine =

Chemical compound

Clinical data
- ATC code: A03AX02 (WHO)

Identifiers
- IUPAC name: N,N-Diisopropyl-3,3-diphenylpropan-1-amine
- CAS Number: 5966-41-6
- PubChem CID: 22262
- ChemSpider: 20899
- UNII: 2825S6AW9U
- KEGG: D07092
- ChEMBL: ChEMBL2106314
- CompTox Dashboard (EPA): DTXSID60208343
- ECHA InfoCard: 100.025.230

Chemical and physical data
- Formula: C_{21}H_{29}N
- Molar mass: 295.470 g·mol^{−1}
- 3D model (JSmol): Interactive image
- SMILES: c1ccccc1C(c2ccccc2)CCN(C(C)C)C(C)C
- InChI: InChI=1S/C21H29N/c1-17(2)22(18(3)4)16-15-21(19-11-7-5-8-12-19)20-13-9-6-10-14-20/h5-14,17-18,21H,15-16H2,1-4H3; Key:YBJKOPHEJOMRMN-UHFFFAOYSA-N

Diisopromine or disoprominum, usually as the hydrochloride salt, is a synthetic spasmolytic which neutralizes spastic conditions of the biliary tract and of the sphincter of Oddi. It was discovered at Janssen Pharmaceutica in 1955. It is sold in South Africa under the brand name Agofell syrup as a mixture with sorbitol, and elsewhere as Megabyl.

== See also ==
- Fenpiprane
- Delucemine
