= Trimebutine =

Chemical compound

Clinical data
- Trade names: Debridat, Recutin, Polybutin, others
- AHFS/Drugs.com: International Drug Names
- Routes of administration: Oral
- Drug class: Various actions
- ATC code: A03AA05 (WHO)

Pharmacokinetic data
- Metabolites: nortrimebutine, N-didesmethyltrimebutine, 2-dimethylamino-2-phenylbutan-1-ol, 2-methylamino-2-phenylbutan-1-ol, 2-amino-2-phenylbutan-1-ol
- Elimination half-life: 2.77 h (for oral dose 200 mg)
- Excretion: renal, fecal

Identifiers
- IUPAC name: 2-(dimethylamino)-2-phenylbutyl 3,4,5-trimethoxybenzoate
- CAS Number: 39133-31-8
- PubChem CID: 5573
- PubChem SID: 310265016
- ChemSpider: 5372
- UNII: QZ1OJ92E5R
- ChEBI: CHEBI:94458
- ChEMBL: ChEMBL190044
- CompTox Dashboard (EPA): DTXSID4023707
- ECHA InfoCard: 100.049.354

Chemical and physical data
- Formula: C_{22}H_{29}NO_{5}
- Molar mass: 387.476 g·mol^{−1}
- 3D model (JSmol): Interactive image
- Density: 1.1 ± 0.1 g/cm^{3} g/cm^{3}
- Boiling point: 457.9 °C (856.2 °F) at 760 mmHg
- SMILES: CCC(COC(=O)C1=CC(=C(C(=C1)OC)OC)OC)(C2=CC=CC=C2)N(C)C
- InChI: InChI=1S/C22H29NO5/c1-7-22(23(2)3,17-11-9-8-10-12-17)15-28-21(24)16-13-18(25-4)20(27-6)19(14-16)26-5/h8-14H,7,15H2,1-6H3; Key:LORDFXWUHHSAQU-UHFFFAOYSA-N

Trimebutine is a drug which is used in the treatment of irritable bowel syndrome and other gastrointestinal disorders. It is sometimes combined with simethicone as a combination drug. Trimebutine is formulated as a tablet or granules for oral suspension.

== Medical uses ==
Trimebutine is used in the treatment of irritable bowel syndrome (IBS) and other gastrointestinal disorders.

== Side effects ==
Trimebutine may cause following side effects:

- Psychiatric disturbances: anxiety
- CNS reactions: somnolence, malaise, vertigo, paresthesia, headache, apathy
- Ear problems: hearing loss
- Heart problems: tachycardia
- GI reactions: xerostomia, taste disorders, diarrhoea, dyspepsia, upper quadrant pain, lip paresthesia, nausea, vomiting, constipation, excessive thirst
- Hepatic and bile ducts reactions: hepatic insufficiency, hepatitis, increased liver enzymes
- Skin and soft tissue reactions: rash, pruritus, urticaria, flushing, blistering, lumps, exudation, erythema multiforme
- Renal reactions: urinary retention
- Reproductive system reactions: dysmenorrhoea, mastitis, gynecomastia in males, breast pain

=== Carcinogenicity ===
According to European Medicines Agency, formulations of trimebutine might be contaminated with N-nitrosamines. However, it was assigned CPCA Category 5 with acceptable daily intake of 1500 ng/day.

== Interactions ==
Trimebutine can increase the length of anaesthesia induced with d-tubocurarine. Other interactions include:

- Potentiation of anticholinergic effects caused by zotepine
- Decreasing efficacy of cisapride
- Procainamide (potentiation of vagus nerve activity inhibition, thereby causing a positive chronotropic effect and, in turn, tachycardia)
- calcium channel blockers

== Pharmacology ==
=== Pharmacodynamics ===
Trimebutine is a multimodal drug that acts on many receptors in the body. Its main effects are mediated through inhibition of voltage-gated L-type calcium channels, thereby decreasing calcium influx in smooth muscle in the gut. This mechanism explains its ability to slow peristalsis, which in turn helps with diarrhoea management in IBS patients. Antispasmodic effect is mediated through inhibition of inward rectifier potassium channels and calcium-dependend potassium channels. Moreover, trimebutine and its metabolite N-desmethyltrimebutine exert non-selective antagonistic effect on muscarinic acetylcholine receptors, which is believed to potentiate its antispasmodic effects, as do many other drugs in this class.

Moreover, trimebutine and N-desmethyltrimebutine act as weak agonists of opioid receptors, specifically μ-, δ-, and κ-opioid receptor subtypes throughout the gut, which was shown in animal-model studies. Trimebutine exerts its effects in part due to causing a premature activation of phase III of the migrating motor complex in the digestive tract. This mode of action explains trimebutine's ability to mediate gastrointestinal motility in different parts of the gastrointestinal tract, both stimulating and inhibiting spontaneous contractions.

In vitro, trimebutine also exhibits antagonistic effects in sodium channels with IC_{50} equal 8.4 μM and inhibits glutamate release.

=== Absorption and distribution ===
Oral bioavailability of trimebutine is nearly 100% for the maleate salt. Maximum serum concentration (C_{max}) is achieved after 30 minutes for 100 mg dose and 0.88 h for 200 mg dose. The level of serum albumin binding is minimal. Half-life (t_{1/2}) of 200 mg timebutine maleate is equal to 2.77 h.

=== Metabolism and excretion ===
Trimebutine exhibits first-pass metabolism effect, which in turn generates N-desmethyltrimebutine (nortrimebutine). Predominantly, trimebutine is excreted in urine, mainly as 2-dimethylamino-2-phenylbutan-1-ol, whereas fecal excretion is minimal (5-12%). Additionally, trimebutine might be metabolised through glucuronidation.

== Chemistry ==
=== Synthesis ===
Trimebutine can be synthesised from 1-phenylpropan-1-one (1). Firstly, it is converted to the corresponding oxirane through trimethylsulfoxonium idoide with sodium hydride in DMSO and THF, yielding 2-ethyl-2-phenyl-oxirane (2). Next, 2 undergoes ring-opening with dimethylaluminium N,N-dimethylamide in diethyl ether, yielding 2-(dimethylamino)-2-phenyl-butan-1-ol (4) and 2-phenylbutanal (3) as a byproduct. Then, 4 reacts with 3,4,5-trimethoxybenzoyl chloride (5) in triethylamine and THF, which is catalysed by 4-dimethylaminopyrridine (DMAP), yielding trimebutine.

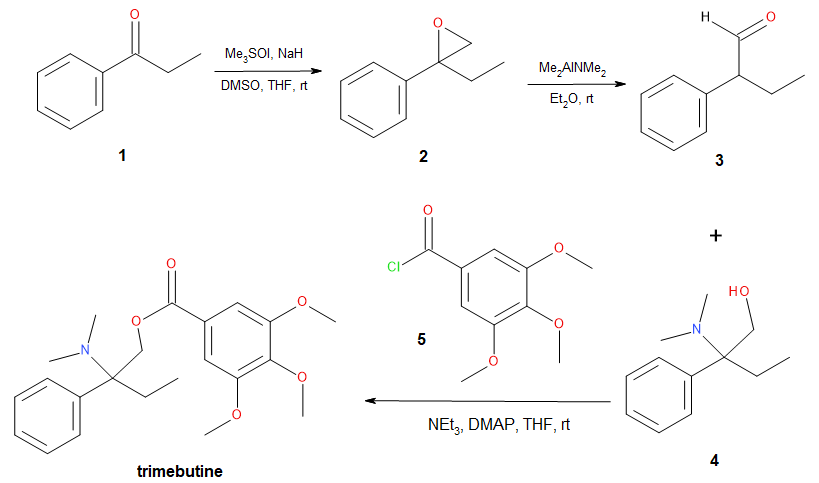
Trimebutine synthesis

== Society and culture ==
=== Brand names ===
The maleic acid salt of trimebutine is marketed under the trademarks of Antinime, Cineprac, Colospasmyl, Colypan, Crolipsa, Debricol, Debridat, Debretin, Digedrat, Espabion, Gast Reg, Ircolon, Irritratil, Krisxon, Muttifen, Neotina, Polybutin, Sangalina, Trebutel, Tribudat, Tributina, Tribux, Trim, Trimeb, Trimedat, and Trimedine. Combination with medazepam appears to have been marketed.

== Research ==
Trimebutine is investigated for the treatment of functional dyspepsia-IBS overlap syndrome, post-operative nausea and vomiting. A clinical trial evaluating trimebutine as an adjunctive treatment to rabeprazole-resistant reflux oesophageitis was withdrawn due to lack of funds.

=== Novel salts of trimebutine ===
Wallace et al. synthesised several new salts with improved analgesic properties in patients with irritable bowel syndrome. These include:

- Trimebutine nitroarginate and derivatives – arginine nitro-derivative acts as a nitric oxide donor, which exerts anti-inflammatory effect (similarly to naproxcinod)
- Trimebutine thiocarbamoylbenzoate – thioamide group acts as a hydrogen sulfide donor, also acting as an anti-inflammatory and analgesic agent

=== Acute ulcerative colitis ===
Trimebutine maleate encapsulated by nanostructured lipid carriers was shown to induce protective effects on colon mucosa in acetic-acid colitis in rats.

=== Cancer ===
Heejin et al. showed that trimebutine is effective at stopping ovarian cancer cells from growing in vitro. This effect is believed to be exerted through G0/G1 phase switch arrest, voltage-gated calcium channels and calcium-activated potassium channels inhibition and suppressing Wnt, Notch and Hedgehog pathways.

Yi-pu Fan et al. found that trimebutine can inhibit glioma and glioblastoma cells from proliferating by promoting apoptosis and downregulation of Bcl-2, thereby upregulating Bax pro-apoptotic factor.

=== Alkaline corneal burns ===
Hitoshi et al. showed that trimebutine can inhibit inflammation in corneal burns caused by alkali. This protective activity is thought to be mediated by high-mobility group box 1-receptor inhibitor, which causes decreased macrophage and neutrophil infiltration.

== See also ==
- Asimadoline
- Fedotozine
