= Monomethyl-sulfatase =

Class of enzymes

Identifiers
- EC no.: 3.1.6.16

Databases
- BRENDA: enzyme data
- ExPASy: NiceZyme view
- KEGG: enzyme entry
- MetaCyc: metabolic pathway
- Rhea: reactions
- PDB structures: RCSB PDB PDBe PDBsum
- Gene Ontology: AmiGO / QuickGO
Search
- PMC: articles
- PubMed: articles
- NCBI: proteins

The enzyme monomethyl-sulfatase (EC 3.1.6.16) catalyzes the reaction

methyl bisulfate
H_{2}O
H_{2}SO_{4}
methanol

The enzyme characterised from methylotroph species hydrolyses methyl bisulfate to methanol and sulfate.

This enzyme belongs to the family of hydrolases, specifically those acting on sulfuric ester bonds. The systematic name is monomethyl-sulfate sulfohydrolase.
