= Homatropine methylbromide =

Pharmaceutical drug

Clinical data
- Other names: Methylhomatropine bromide
- ATC code: A03BB06 (WHO)

Identifiers
- IUPAC name: (N,N-Dimethyl-8-azoniabicyclo[3.2.1]oct-3-yl) 2-hydroxy-2-phenylacetate bromide
- CAS Number: 80-49-9
- PubChem CID: 6646
- DrugBank: DB00725
- ChemSpider: 6394
- UNII: 68JRS2HC1C
- KEGG: D02070
- ChEMBL: ChEMBL1200851
- CompTox Dashboard (EPA): DTXSID4023127
- ECHA InfoCard: 100.001.168

Chemical and physical data
- Formula: C_{17}H_{24}BrNO_{3}
- Molar mass: 370.287 g·mol^{−1}
- 3D model (JSmol): Interactive image
- SMILES: C[N+]1(C2CCC1CC(C2)OC(=O)C(C3=CC=CC=C3)O)C.[Br-]
- InChI: InChI=1S/C17H24NO3.BrH/c1-18(2)13-8-9-14(18)11-15(10-13)21-17(20)16(19)12-6-4-3-5-7-12;/h3-7,13-16,19H,8-11H2,1-2H3;1H/q+1;/p-1/t13-,14+,15+,16?; Key:ZTVIKZXZYLEVOL-MCOXGKPRSA-N

Homatropine methylbromide (INN; also known as methylhomatropine bromide) is a quaternary ammonium salt of methylhomatropine. It is a peripherally acting anticholinergic medication that inhibits muscarinic acetylcholine receptors and thus the parasympathetic nervous system. It does not cross the blood–brain barrier. It is used to effectively relieve intestinal spasms and abdominal cramps, without producing the adverse effects of less specific anticholinergics. It is used, in addition to papaverine, as a component of mild drugs that help "flush" the bile.

Certain preparations of drugs such as hydrocodone are mixed with a small, sub-therapeutic amount of homatropine methylbromide to discourage intentional overdose.

== Contraindications ==
- Untreated glaucoma
- Myasthenia gravis
- Severe heart failure
- Thyrotoxicosis

== See also ==
- Homatropine
