= Oxyphenonium bromide =

Chemical compound

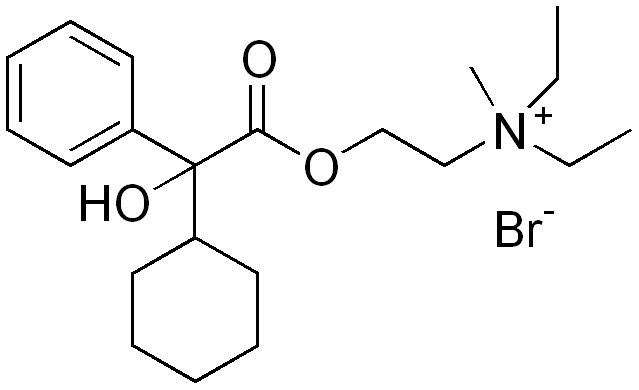

Clinical data
- AHFS/Drugs.com: International Drug Names
- ATC code: A03AB03 (WHO)

Identifiers
- IUPAC name: 2-(2-Cyclohexyl-2-hydroxy-2-phenylacetoxy)-N,N-diethyl-N-methylethanaminium bromide
- CAS Number: 50-10-2
- PubChem CID: 5748
- ChemSpider: 5546
- UNII: S9421HWB3Z
- KEGG: D06877
- ChEMBL: ChEMBL1200906
- CompTox Dashboard (EPA): DTXSID4045632
- ECHA InfoCard: 100.000.010

Chemical and physical data
- Formula: C_{21}H_{34}BrNO_{3}
- Molar mass: 428.411 g·mol^{−1}
- 3D model (JSmol): Interactive image
- SMILES: OC(C(=O)OCC[N+](C)(CC)CC)(c1ccccc1)C2CCCCC2.[Br-]
- InChI: InChI=1S/C21H34NO3.BrH/c1-4-22(3,5-2)16-17-25-20(23)21(24,18-12-8-6-9-13-18)19-14-10-7-11-15-19;/h6,8-9,12-13,19,24H,4-5,7,10-11,14-17H2,1-3H3;1H/q+1;/p-1; Key:UKLQXHUGTKWPSR-UHFFFAOYSA-M

Oxyphenonium bromide is an antimuscarinic drug. It is used to treat gastric and duodenal ulcers and to relieve visceral spasms.
