= Ambutonium bromide =

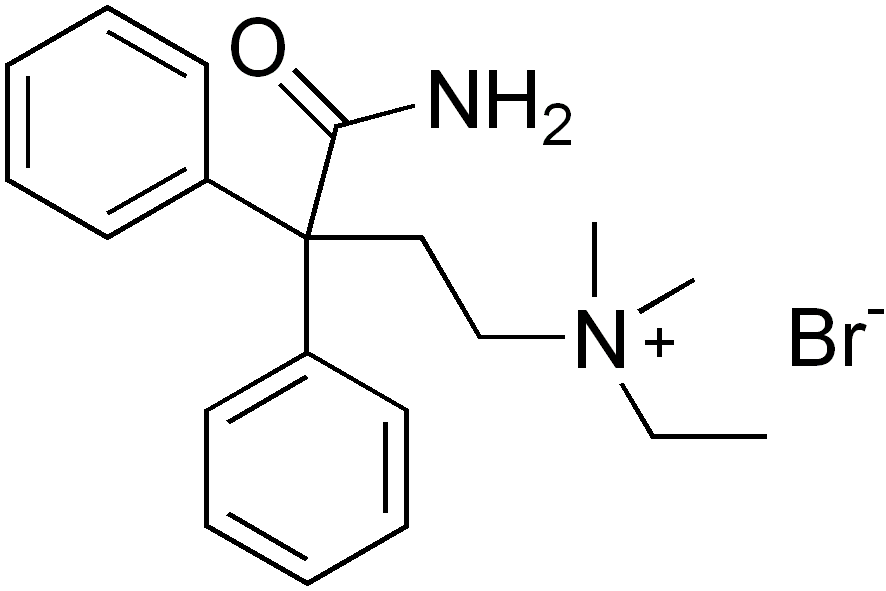

Names
- Preferred IUPAC name 4-Amino-N-ethyl-N,N-dimethyl-4-oxo-3,3-diphenylbutan-1-aminium bromide

Identifiers
CAS Number	115-51-5
3D model (JSmol)	Interactive image
ChEMBL	ChEMBL2105972
ChemSpider	7977
ECHA InfoCard	100.003.721
PubChem CID	8276
UNII	9J8YA3ZT14
CompTox Dashboard (EPA)	DTXSID40921583
- InChI: InChI=1S/C20H26N2O.BrH/c1-4-22(2,3)16-15-20(19(21)23,17-11-7-5-8-12-17)18-13-9-6-10-14-18;/h5-14H,4,15-16H2,1-3H3,(H-,21,23);1H Key: VTAGVKVPFBOVRM-UHFFFAOYSA-N
- SMILES: [Br-].O=C(N)C(c1ccccc1)(c2ccccc2)CC[N+](CC)(C)C

Properties
Chemical formula	C_{20}H_{27}BrN_{2}O
Molar mass	391.35 g/mol

Pharmacology
ATC code	A03CA07 (WHO) in combination with
- Except where otherwise noted, data are given for materials in their standard state (at 25 °C [77 °F], 100 kPa). verify (what is ?) Infobox references

Ambutonium bromide is a muscarinic antagonist used in ulcer therapy
