= Prifinium bromide =

Chemical compound

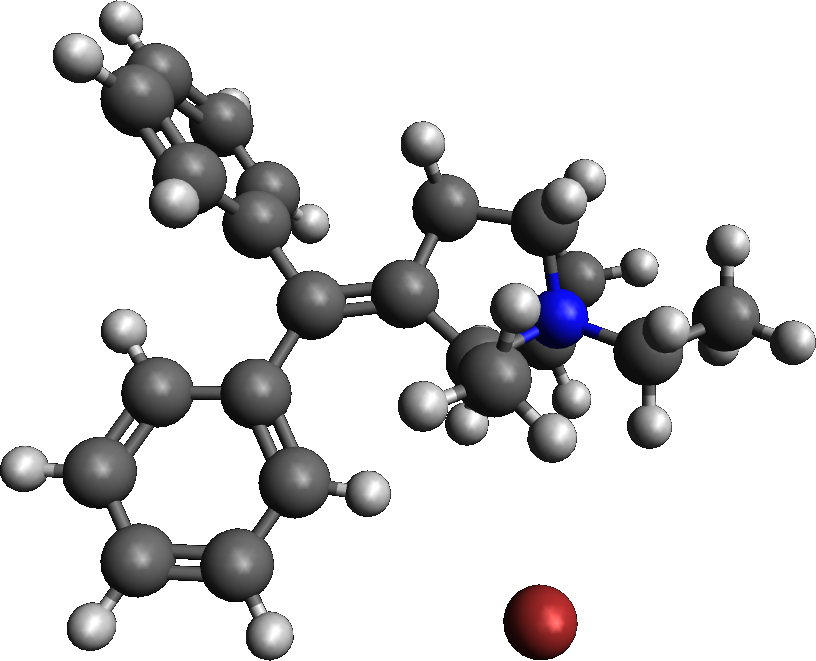

Clinical data
- AHFS/Drugs.com: International Drug Names
- ATC code: A03AB18 (WHO)

Identifiers
- IUPAC name: 3-(Diphenylmethylene)-1,1-diethyl-2-methylpyrrolidinium bromide
- CAS Number: 4630-95-9
- PubChem CID: 20749
- ChemSpider: 19537
- UNII: 3B7O9ZC520
- ChEMBL: ChEMBL1213353
- CompTox Dashboard (EPA): DTXSID3023508
- ECHA InfoCard: 100.022.774

Chemical and physical data
- Formula: C_{22}H_{28}BrN
- Molar mass: 386.377 g·mol^{−1}
- InChI: InChI=1S/C22H28N.BrH/c1-4-23(5-2)17-16-21(18(23)3)22(19-12-8-6-9-13-19)20-14-10-7-11-15-20;/h6-15,18H,4-5,16-17H2,1-3H3;1H/q+1;/p-1; Key:UCGJZJXOPSNTGZ-UHFFFAOYSA-M

Prifinium bromide is a pharmaceutical drug used primarily in the treatment of irritable bowel syndrome due to its action as an anticholinergic.

Prifinium bromide's mechanism of action is believed to be due to its activity as an antispasmodic agent.

Prifinium bromide is an antimuscarinic.
