= Dimethylaminopropionylphenothiazine =

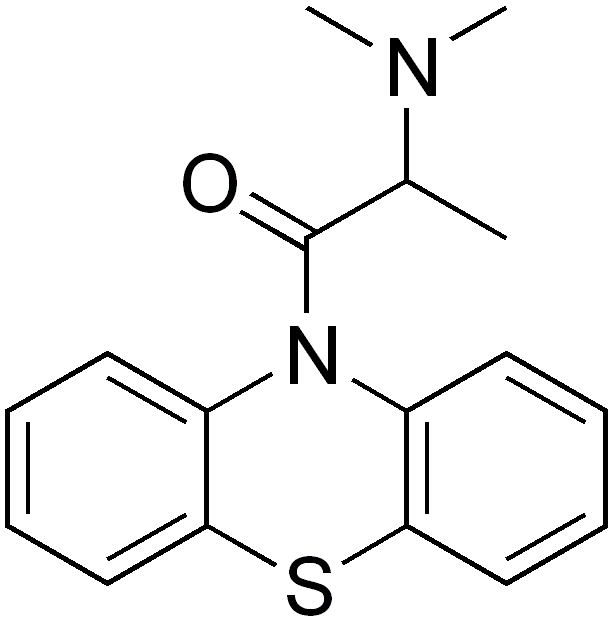

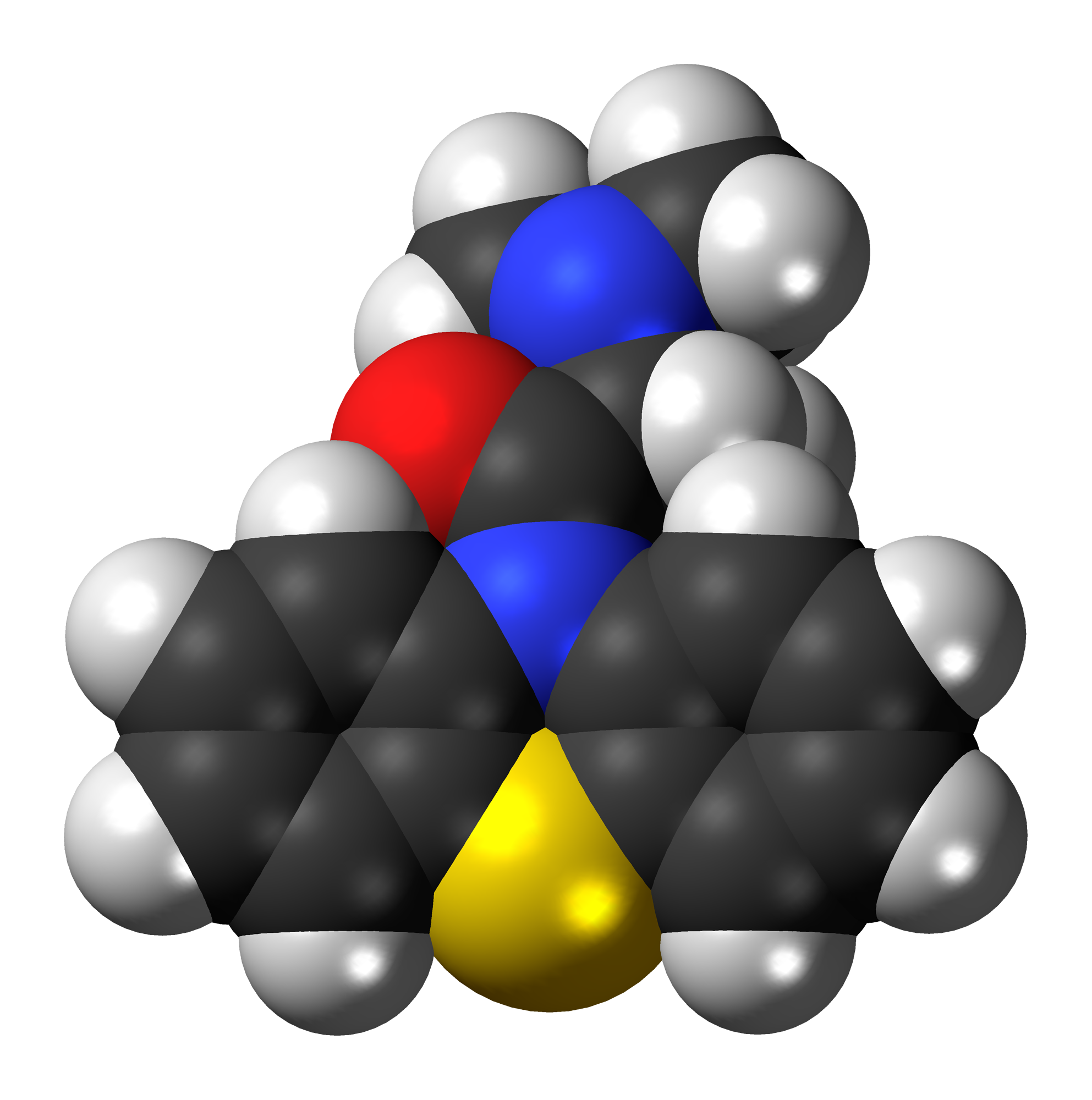

Names
- IUPAC name 2-(Dimethylamino)-1-phenothiazin-10-ylpropan-1-one
- Other names Astra 1397

Identifiers
CAS Number	63834-04-8; 51818-93-0 (HCl)
3D model (JSmol)	Interactive image
ChemSpider	102089
PubChem CID	113918
UNII	00435Z54H1; R6LE8V69WA (HCl)
CompTox Dashboard (EPA)	DTXSID50980424
- InChI: InChI=1S/C17H18N2OS/c1-12(18(2)3)17(20)19-13-8-4-6-10-15(13)21-16-11-7-5-9-14(16)19/h4-12H,1-3H3 Key: POZJNEBUHLZROM-UHFFFAOYSA-N; InChI=1/C17H18N2OS/c1-12(18(2)3)17(20)19-13-8-4-6-10-15(13)21-16-11-7-5-9-14(16)19/h4-12H,1-3H3 Key: POZJNEBUHLZROM-UHFFFAOYAG
- SMILES: CC(C(=O)N1C2=CC=CC=C2SC3=CC=CC=C31)N(C)C

Properties
Chemical formula	C_{17}H_{18}N_{2}OS
Molar mass	298.40 g/mol

Pharmacology
ATC code	A03AC02 (WHO)
- Except where otherwise noted, data are given for materials in their standard state (at 25 °C [77 °F], 100 kPa). verify (what is ?) Infobox references

Dimethylaminopropionylphenothiazine or 10-(alpha-dimethylaminopropionyl)phenothiazine is an antispasmodic.
