= Pinaverium bromide =

Chemical compound

Clinical data
- ATC code: A03AX04 (WHO)

Identifiers
- IUPAC name: 4-[(2-Bromo-4,5-dimethoxyphenyl)methyl]-4-[2-[2-(6,6-dimethyl-4-bicyclo[3.1.1]heptanyl)ethoxy]ethyl]morpholin-4-ium bromide
- CAS Number: 53251-94-8
- PubChem CID: 40703
- DrugBank: DBSALT001130
- ChemSpider: 37181
- UNII: 7SCF54H12J
- CompTox Dashboard (EPA): DTXSID90860655

Chemical and physical data
- Formula: C_{26}H_{41}Br_{2}NO_{4}
- Molar mass: 591.425 g·mol^{−1}
- 3D model (JSmol): Interactive image
- SMILES: CC1(C2CCC(C1C2)CCOCC[N+]3(CCOCC3)Cc4cc(c(cc4Br)OC)OC)C.[Br-]
- InChI: InChI=1S/C26H41BrNO4.BrH/c1-26(2)21-6-5-19(22(26)16-21)7-11-31-12-8-28(9-13-32-14-10-28)18-20-15-24(29-3)25(30-4)17-23(20)27;/h15,17,19,21-22H,5-14,16,18H2,1-4H3;1H/q+1;/p-1; Key:IKGXLCMLVINENI-UHFFFAOYSA-M

Pinaverium bromide (INN) is a medication used for functional gastrointestinal disorders. It belongs to a drug group called antispasmodics and acts as a calcium channel blocker in helping to restore the normal contraction process of the bowel. It is most effective when taken for a full course of treatment and is not designed for immediate symptom relief or sporadic, intermittent use.

Pinaverium bromide was first registered in 1975 by Solvay Pharmaceuticals (now a division of Abbott Laboratories), and marketed globally using the brand names Dicetel and Eldicet. Generic pinaverium is available in South Korea under a trade name of Disten and in Argentina as Nulite.

== Indications ==
It is indicated for the treatment and relief of symptoms associated with irritable bowel syndrome (IBS) including abdominal pain, bowel disturbances and intestinal discomfort; and treatment of symptoms related to functional disorders of biliary tract.
