= Methylatropine =

Chemical compound

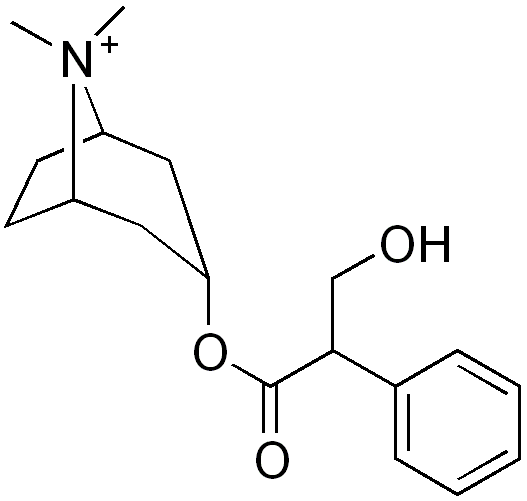

Clinical data
- Trade names: Eumydrin
- Other names: Methylatropinium; Methyl atropine; Methyl atropine nitrate; Methylatropine nitrate; Atropine methyl nitrate
- ATC code: A03BB02 (WHO)

Identifiers
- IUPAC name: (1R,5R)-3-[(3-hydroxy-2-phenylpropanoyl)oxy]-8,8-dimethyl-8-azoniabicyclo[3.2.1]octane
- CAS Number: 31610-87-4
- PubChem CID: 1550101
- DrugBank: DB13833
- ChemSpider: 5652
- UNII: 80719I460H
- ChEMBL: ChEMBL1179176
- CompTox Dashboard (EPA): DTXSID50858977

Chemical and physical data
- Formula: C_{18}H_{26}NO_{3}
- Molar mass: 304.410 g·mol^{−1}
- 3D model (JSmol): Interactive image
- SMILES: C[N+]1(C2CCC1CC(C2)OC(=O)C(CO)C3=CC=CC=C3)C
- InChI: InChI=1S/C18H26NO3/c1-19(2)14-8-9-15(19)11-16(10-14)22-18(21)17(12-20)13-6-4-3-5-7-13/h3-7,14-17,20H,8-12H2,1-2H3/q+1/t14-,15+,16?,17-/m0/s1; Key:PIPAJLPNWZMYQA-WFVVYAPDSA-N

Methylatropine, also known as methylatropinium or N-methylatropinium, is a quaternary ammonium derivative of atropine sold under the brand name Eumydrin. It is, first and foremost, a potent muscarinic cholinergic antagonist.

In 1902, the Bayer Company introduced methylatropine, a quaternary ammonium salt of atropine, as a mydriatic for dilation of the pupil during ophthalmic examination under the brand name of Eumydrin. Because of its highly polar nature it penetrated less readily into the central nervous system than did atropine; hence it was introduced for relieving pyloric spasm in infants.

The blocking potency of methylatropine is approximately 10-20 times higher than that of atropine at neuromuscular and ganglionic synapses.

== See also ==
- Apoatropine
