= Rociverine =

Chemical compound

Clinical data
- ATC code: A03AA06 (WHO)

Identifiers
- IUPAC name: 1-(diethylamino)propan-2-yl (1S,2S)-2-cyclohexyl-2-hydroxycyclohexane-1-carboxylate
- CAS Number: 53716-44-2
- PubChem CID: 24892842
- DrugBank: DB13581
- ChemSpider: 28534065
- UNII: VI08KS44V0
- KEGG: D07078
- ChEBI: CHEBI:135440
- ChEMBL: ChEMBL4755537
- CompTox Dashboard (EPA): DTXSID501023860
- ECHA InfoCard: 100.053.356

Chemical and physical data
- Formula: C_{20}H_{37}NO_{3}
- Molar mass: 339.520 g·mol^{−1}
- 3D model (JSmol): Interactive image
- SMILES: CCN(CC)CC(C)OC(=O)[C@H]1CCCC[C@@]1(C2CCCCC2)O
- InChI: InChI=InChI=1S/C20H37NO3/c1-4-21(5-2)15-16(3)24-19(22)18-13-9-10-14-20(18,23)17-11-7-6-8-12-17/h16-18,23H,4-15H2,1-3H3/t16?,18-,20+/m1/s1; Key:XPYLKZZOBVLVHB-QDKIRNHSSA-N

Rociverine is an antispasmodic drug used to treat urinary, gastrointestinal and biliary spasms. It is antimuscarinic drug.

== Medical uses ==
In India, rociverine is used as part of the "Programmed Labour Protocol" to help reduce pain and shorten the duration of labor. However, an analysis of clinical trials provides little evidence supporting its effectiveness in reducing labor duration.

== Pharmacology ==
The (1R,2R) stereoisomer showed 240-fold greater affinity for the muscarinic receptor, but the (1S,2S) compound showed the best selectivity.
