= Benzilone =

Chemical compound

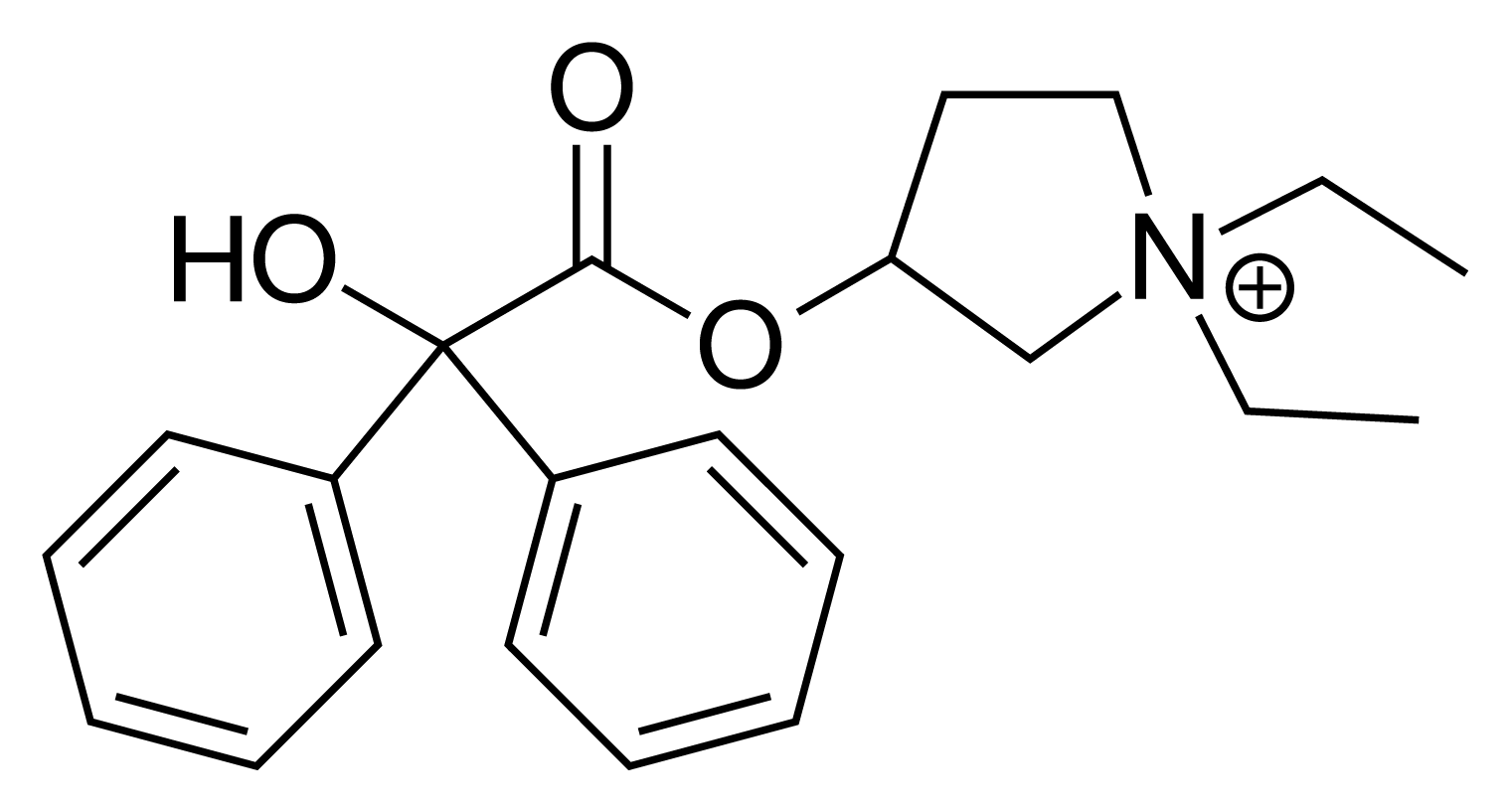

Clinical data
- ATC code: A03AB01 (WHO)

Identifiers
- IUPAC name: 1,1-diethyl-3-(2-hydroxy-2,2-diphenylacetoxy)pyrrolidinium
- CAS Number: 16175-92-1 1050-48-2 (bromide)
- PubChem CID: 66248
- ChemSpider: 59632
- UNII: GY56LQX77B
- ChEMBL: ChEMBL2106061
- CompTox Dashboard (EPA): DTXSID40859574

Chemical and physical data
- Formula: C_{22}H_{28}NO_{3}
- Molar mass: 354.470 g·mol^{−1}
- 3D model (JSmol): Interactive image
- SMILES: O=C(OC1CC[N+](CC)(CC)C1)C(O)(c2ccccc2)c3ccccc3
- InChI: InChI=1S/C22H28NO3/c1-3-23(4-2)16-15-20(17-23)26-21(24)22(25,18-11-7-5-8-12-18)19-13-9-6-10-14-19/h5-14,20,25H,3-4,15-17H2,1-2H3/q+1; Key:ZKCWITXZGWUJAV-UHFFFAOYSA-N

Benzilone is an antimuscarinic drug.
