= Fentonium bromide =

Pharmaceutical drug

Clinical data
- ATC code: A03BB04 (WHO)

Pharmacokinetic data
- Bioavailability: 1

Identifiers
- IUPAC name: [8-Methyl-8-[2-oxo-2-(4-phenylphenyl)ethyl]-8-azoniabicyclo[3.2.1]octan-3-yl] 3-hydroxy-2-phenylpropanoate bromide
- CAS Number: 5868-06-4
- PubChem CID: 71534
- DrugBank: DB08978
- ChemSpider: 64607
- UNII: XS152O7VCZ
- KEGG: D07951
- ECHA InfoCard: 100.025.018

Chemical and physical data
- Formula: C_{31}H_{34}BrNO_{4}
- Molar mass: 564.520 g·mol^{−1}
- 3D model (JSmol): Interactive image
- SMILES: C[N+]1(C2CCC1CC(C2)OC(=O)C(CO)C3=CC=CC=C3)CC(=O)C4=CC=C(C=C4)C5=CC=CC=C5.[Br-]
- InChI: InChI=1S/C31H34NO4.BrH/c1-32(20-30(34)25-14-12-23(13-15-25)22-8-4-2-5-9-22)26-16-17-27(32)19-28(18-26)36-31(35)29(21-33)24-10-6-3-7-11-24;/h2-15,26-29,33H,16-21H2,1H3;1H/q+1;/p-1; Key:MPLNGQBULSHWQW-UHFFFAOYSA-M

Fentonium bromide (INN) is an anticholinergic and antispasmodic atropine derivative. In the US its patent number is 3,356,682. It is sold by Sanofi-Aventis and Zambon.
