= Otilonium bromide =

Chemical compound

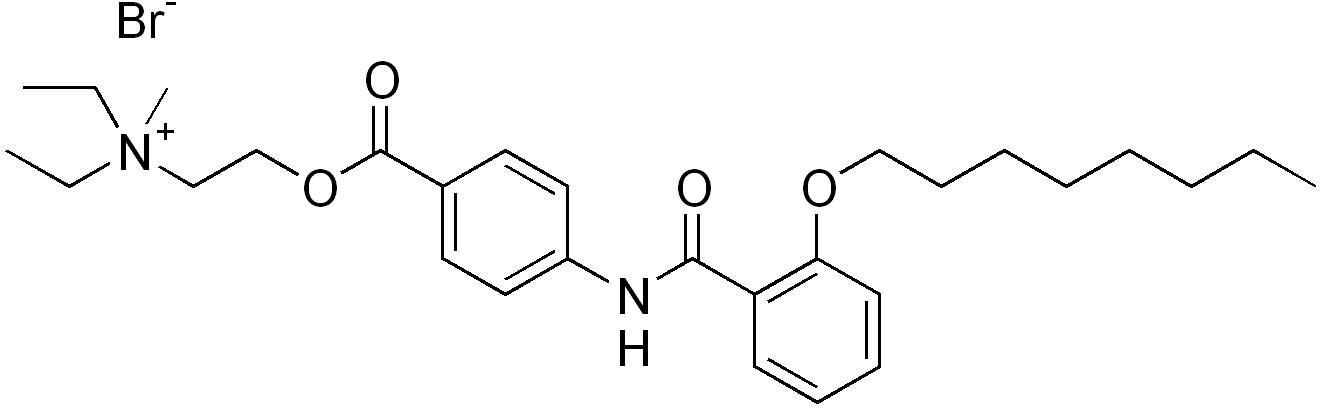

Clinical data
- Trade names: Spasmoctyl 40, Doralin, Menoctyl
- AHFS/Drugs.com: International Drug Names
- ATC code: A03AB06 (WHO)

Pharmacokinetic data
- Bioavailability: 1.1%

Identifiers
- IUPAC name: N,N-Diethyl-N-methyl-2-(4-[2-(octyloxy)benzamido]benzoyloxy)ethanaminium bromide
- CAS Number: 26095-59-0
- PubChem CID: 72092
- ChemSpider: 65077
- UNII: 21HN3N72PV
- KEGG: D07083
- CompTox Dashboard (EPA): DTXSID0046357
- ECHA InfoCard: 100.043.128

Chemical and physical data
- Formula: C_{29}H_{43}BrN_{2}O_{4}
- Molar mass: 563.577 g·mol^{−1}
- 3D model (JSmol): Interactive image
- SMILES: CCCCCCCCOC1=CC=CC=C1C(=O)NC2=CC=C(C=C2)C(=O)OCC[N+](C)(CC)CC.[Br-]
- InChI: InChI=1S/C29H42N2O4.BrH/c1-5-8-9-10-11-14-22-34-27-16-13-12-15-26(27)28(32)30-25-19-17-24(18-20-25)29(33)35-23-21-31(4,6-2)7-3;/h12-13,15-20H,5-11,14,21-23H2,1-4H3;1H; Key:VWZPIJGXYWHBOW-UHFFFAOYSA-N

Otilonium bromide is a drug used to treat abdominal pain caused by irritable bowel syndrome. It is an antispasmodic, which is useful to treat the symptoms of irritable bowel syndrome by reducing abdominal spasms (colic), bloating, pain, and gut motility.

It is an antimuscarinic and calcium channel blocker used to relieve spasmodic pain of the gut, especially in irritable bowel syndrome. This means it works in the gut themselves, by relaxing the small muscles of the intestines, which results in relieving cramps and therefore reduces pain.

== Medical uses ==
A pooled analysis of three clinical trials suggest that otilonium bromide is more effective than placebo for the treatment of irritable bowel syndrome.

== Pharmacology ==
Otilonium bromide binds to both muscarinic receptors and tachykinin NK_{2} receptors. It has been shown to inhibit L-type and T-type calcium channels, actions which may contribute to or determine its effects in the gut.

When taken orally, very little of the drug is absorbed into the rest of the body, which means that most of its actions remain confined to the gastrointestinal system.

== Adverse effects ==
Otilonium bromide is generally well tolerated and does not have the side-effects observed with similar classes of drugs. A case of cardiovascular toxicity was reported due to an overdose.
