= Penthienate =

Chemical compound

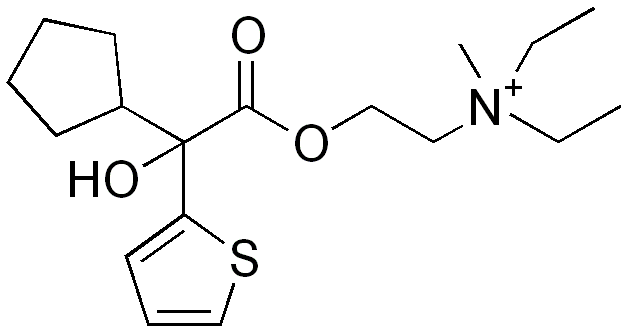

Clinical data
- ATC code: A03AB04 (WHO)

Identifiers
- IUPAC name: 2-{[cyclopentyl(hydroxy)2-thienylacetyl]oxy}-N,N-diethyl-N-methylethanaminium
- CAS Number: 22064-27-3
- PubChem CID: 6067
- ChemSpider: 5843
- UNII: 6LCT38OJV9
- CompTox Dashboard (EPA): DTXSID80871533

Chemical and physical data
- Formula: C_{18}H_{30}NO_{3}S
- Molar mass: 340.50 g·mol^{−1}
- 3D model (JSmol): Interactive image
- SMILES: CC[N+](C)(CC)CCOC(=O)C(C1CCCC1)(C2=CC=CS2)O
- InChI: InChI=1S/C18H30NO3S/c1-4-19(3,5-2)12-13-22-17(20)18(21,15-9-6-7-10-15)16-11-8-14-23-16/h8,11,14-15,21H,4-7,9-10,12-13H2,1-3H3/q+1; Key:NEMLPWNINZELKP-UHFFFAOYSA-N

Penthienate is an anticholinergic and has actions similar to atropine. It reduces gastric motility and secretion and is used for the treatment of peptic ulcer and dyspepsia.
