= Trepibutone =

Chemical compound

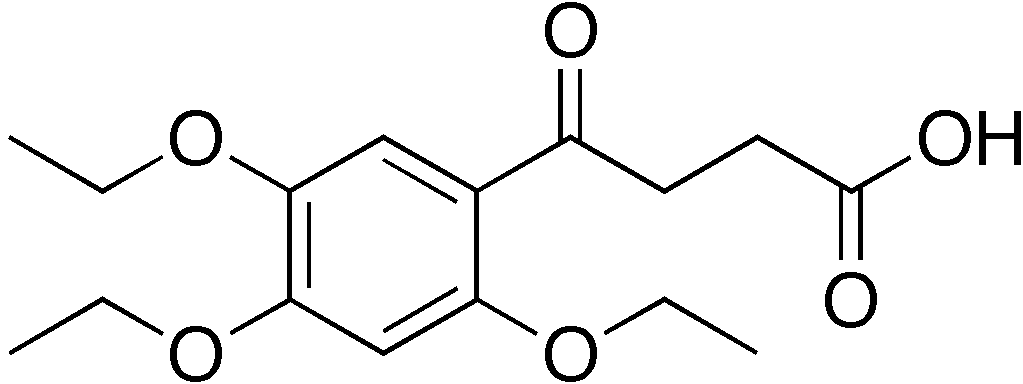

Clinical data
- AHFS/Drugs.com: International Drug Names
- ATC code: A03AX09 (WHO)

Identifiers
- IUPAC name: 4-Oxo-4-(2,4,5-triethoxyphenyl)butanoic acid
- CAS Number: 41826-92-0
- PubChem CID: 5536
- ChemSpider: 5335
- UNII: H1187LU49Q
- CompTox Dashboard (EPA): DTXSID6046634

Chemical and physical data
- Formula: C_{16}H_{22}O_{6}
- Molar mass: 310.346 g·mol^{−1}

Trepibutone is a drug used for functional gastrointestinal disorders. Trepibutone promotes secretion of the bile and pancreatic juice, and accelerates flaccidity of the smooth muscle in the gastrointestinal tract to lower internal pressure of the gallbladder and bile duct. It improves the symptoms of the bile duct and pancreatic disease. It is usually used for improvement of cramp and bile secretion associated with cholelithiasis, cholecystitis, cholangitis, dyskinesia of the biliary tract or postcholecystectomy syndrome, or pain and gastrointestinal symptoms associated with chronic pancreatitis.
