= Camylofin =

Chemical compound

Clinical data
- Other names: Acamylophenine
- AHFS/Drugs.com: International Drug Names
- ATC code: A03AA03 (WHO)

Identifiers
- IUPAC name: Isopentyl 2-[2-(diethylamino)ethylamino]-2-phenylacetate
- CAS Number: 54-30-8
- PubChem CID: 5902
- ChemSpider: 5691
- UNII: 340B6Q764V
- ChEMBL: ChEMBL253592
- CompTox Dashboard (EPA): DTXSID7046415
- ECHA InfoCard: 100.000.184

Chemical and physical data
- Formula: C_{19}H_{32}N_{2}O_{2}
- Molar mass: 320.477 g·mol^{−1}
- 3D model (JSmol): Interactive image
- SMILES: O=C(OCCC(C)C)C(NCCN(CC)CC)c1ccccc1
- InChI: InChI=1S/C19H32N2O2/c1-5-21(6-2)14-13-20-18(17-10-8-7-9-11-17)19(22)23-15-12-16(3)4/h7-11,16,18,20H,5-6,12-15H2,1-4H3; Key:RYOOHIUJEJZCFT-UHFFFAOYSA-N

Camylofin is an antimuscarinic drug.

Camylofin is a smooth muscle relaxant with both anticholinergic action and direct smooth muscle action. Anticholinergic action is produced by inhibiting the binding of acetylcholine to muscarinic receptors, but the action is less pronounced. Direct smooth muscle relaxation is achieved by inhibiting phosphodiesterase type IV, which leads to increased cyclic AMP and eventually reduced cytosolic calcium. Thus camylofin has a comprehensive action to relieve smooth muscle spasm. It is used to treat stomach ache in infants and children. Usually it is given in combination with paracetamol to treat stomach ache, as well as pyrexia.

== Synthesis ==
Synthesis: Patents: Metamizole salt patents:

The Hell–Volhard–Zelinsky halogenation on phenylacetic acid [103-82-2] (1) gives 2-Bromo-2-phenylacetyl bromide, CID:15621041 (2). Treatment with isoamyl alcohol [123-51-3] gives 3-methylbutyl bromo(phenyl)acetate [92018-48-9] (3). Alkylation with N,N-Diethylethylenediamine [100-36-7] (4) completed the synthesis of Camylofin (5).
