= Bevonium =

Chemical compound

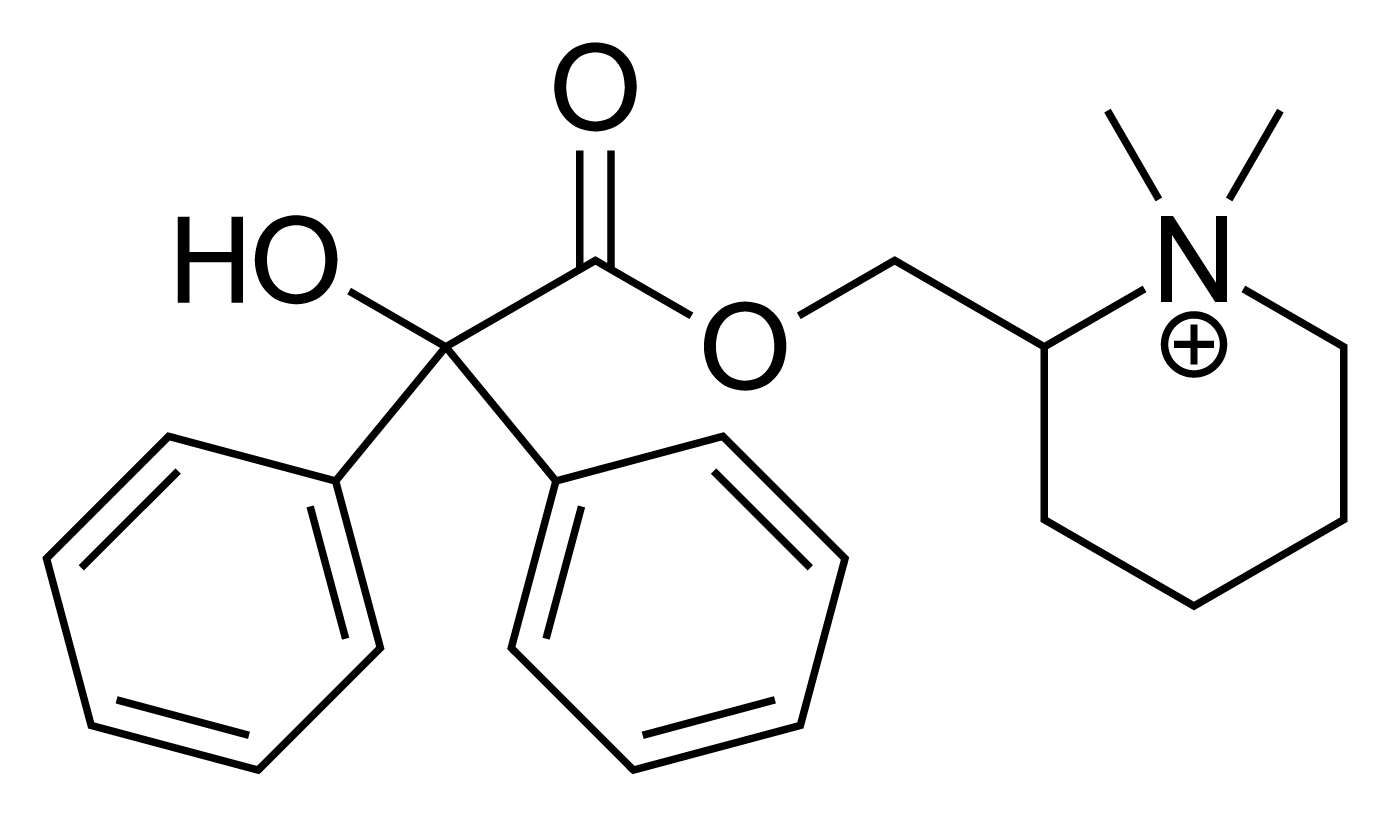

Clinical data
- ATC code: A03AB13 (WHO)

Identifiers
- IUPAC name: 2-[(2-hydroxy-2,2-diphenylacetoxy)methyl]-1,1-dimethylpiperidinium
- CAS Number: 33371-53-8
- PubChem CID: 31800
- ChemSpider: 29489
- UNII: 34B0471E08
- ChEMBL: ChEMBL1882461
- CompTox Dashboard (EPA): DTXSID0048341

Chemical and physical data
- Formula: C_{22}H_{28}NO_{3}^{+}
- Molar mass: 354.470 g·mol^{−1}
- 3D model (JSmol): Interactive image
- SMILES: O=C(OCC1[N+](C)(C)CCCC1)C(O)(c2ccccc2)c3ccccc3
- InChI: InChI=1S/C22H28NO3/c1-23(2)16-10-9-15-20(23)17-26-21(24)22(25,18-11-5-3-6-12-18)19-13-7-4-8-14-19/h3-8,11-14,20,25H,9-10,15-17H2,1-2H3/q+1; Key:UHUMRJKDOOEQIG-UHFFFAOYSA-N

Bevonium (piribenzil) is an antimuscarinic with antispasmodic and bronchodilating properties. The compound is commonly used as the methyl sulfate (metilsulfate).
