= Isopropamide =

Chemical compound

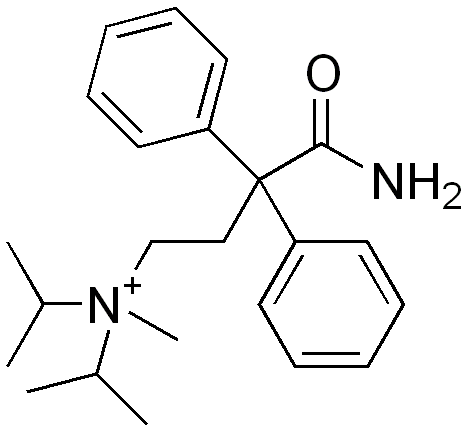

Clinical data
- MedlinePlus: a694006
- Routes of administration: Oral
- ATC code: A03AB09 (WHO)

Legal status
- Legal status: US: ℞-only and Unscheduled; In general: unscheduled

Identifiers
- IUPAC name: 4-amino-N,N-diisopropyl-N-methyl-4-oxo-3,3-diphenylbutan-1-aminium
- CAS Number: 7492-32-2
- PubChem CID: 3775
- DrugBank: DB01625
- ChemSpider: 3643
- UNII: 8B9I31H724
- ChEMBL: ChEMBL1201232
- CompTox Dashboard (EPA): DTXSID9023174
- ECHA InfoCard: 100.028.470

Chemical and physical data
- Formula: C_{23}H_{33}N_{2}O^{+}
- Molar mass: 353.530 g·mol^{−1}
- 3D model (JSmol): Interactive image
- SMILES: O=C(N)C(c1ccccc1)(c2ccccc2)CC[N+](C(C)C)(C(C)C)C
- InChI: InChI=1S/C23H32N2O/c1-18(2)25(5,19(3)4)17-16-23(22(24)26,20-12-8-6-9-13-20)21-14-10-7-11-15-21/h6-15,18-19H,16-17H2,1-5H3,(H-,24,26)/p+1; Key:JTPUMZTWMWIVPA-UHFFFAOYSA-O

Isopropamide (R79) is a long-acting anticholinergic drug. It is used in the treatment of peptic ulcers and other gastrointestinal disorders involving hyperacidity (gastrointestinal acidosis) and hypermotility. Chemically, it contains a quaternary ammonium group. It is most often provided as an iodide salt, but is also available as a bromide or chloride salt. It was discovered at Janssen Pharmaceutica in 1954.
