= Tiemonium iodide =

Chemical compound

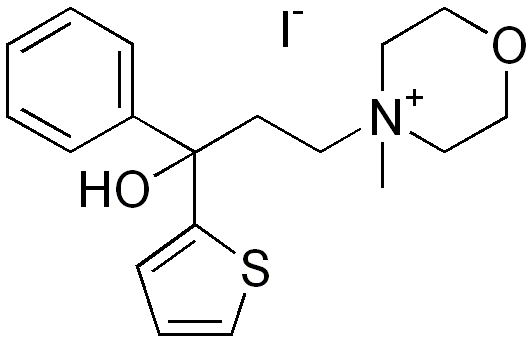

Clinical data
- AHFS/Drugs.com: International Drug Names
- ATC code: A03AB17 (WHO)

Identifiers
- IUPAC name: 4-[3-hydroxy-3-phenyl-3-(2-thienyl)propyl]-4-methylmorpholin-4-ium iodide
- CAS Number: 144-12-7
- PubChem CID: 72142
- ChemSpider: 65116
- UNII: FZ2LZ7U304
- KEGG: D01201
- CompTox Dashboard (EPA): DTXSID00875078
- ECHA InfoCard: 100.005.106

Chemical and physical data
- Formula: C_{18}H_{24}INO_{2}S
- Molar mass: 445.36 g·mol^{−1}
- 3D model (JSmol): Interactive image
- SMILES: C[N+]1(CCOCC1)CCC(C2=CC=CC=C2)(C3=CC=CS3)O.[I-]
- InChI: InChI=1S/C18H24NO2S.HI/c1-19(11-13-21-14-12-19)10-9-18(20,17-8-5-15-22-17)16-6-3-2-4-7-16;/h2-8,15,20H,9-14H2,1H3;1H/q+1;/p-1; Key:IOFXEUZPIIUQAG-UHFFFAOYSA-M

Tiemonium iodide is an antimuscarinic. It is poorly absorbed from the gut. The active moiety is tiemonium, a quaternary ammonium cation.
