= Proxazole =

Chemical compound

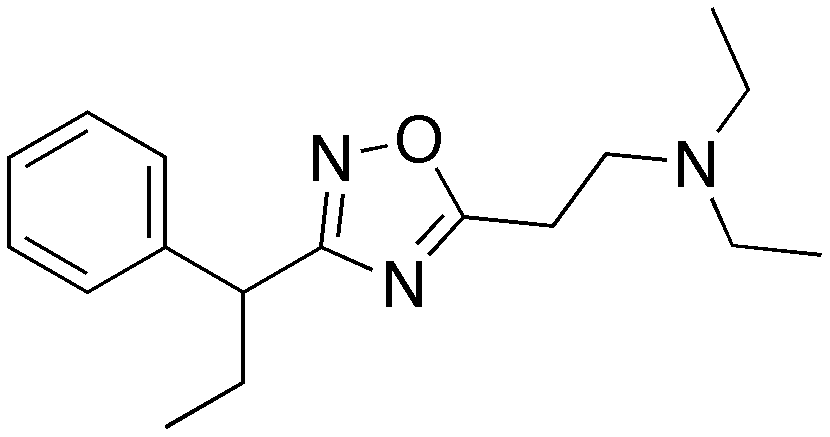

Clinical data
- ATC code: A03AX07 (WHO)

Identifiers
- IUPAC name: (RS)-N,N-diethyl-2-[3-(1-phenylpropyl)-1,2,4-oxadiazol-5-yl]ethanamine
- CAS Number: 5696-09-3
- PubChem CID: 8590
- DrugBank: DB13819
- ChemSpider: 8271
- UNII: FD72T13M0K
- KEGG: D05644
- ChEBI: CHEBI:135191
- ChEMBL: ChEMBL2106997
- CompTox Dashboard (EPA): DTXSID90859261

Chemical and physical data
- Formula: C_{17}H_{25}N_{3}O
- Molar mass: 287.407 g·mol^{−1}
- 3D model (JSmol): Interactive image
- SMILES: CCC(C1=CC=CC=C1)C2=NOC(=N2)CCN(CC)CC
- InChI: InChI=1S/C17H25N3O/c1-4-15(14-10-8-7-9-11-14)17-18-16(21-19-17)12-13-20(5-2)6-3/h7-11,15H,4-6,12-13H2,1-3H3; Key:OLTAWOVKGWWERU-UHFFFAOYSA-N

Proxazole is an analgesic and an anti-inflammatory drug used for functional gastrointestinal disorders.
