= Piperidolate =

Chemical compound

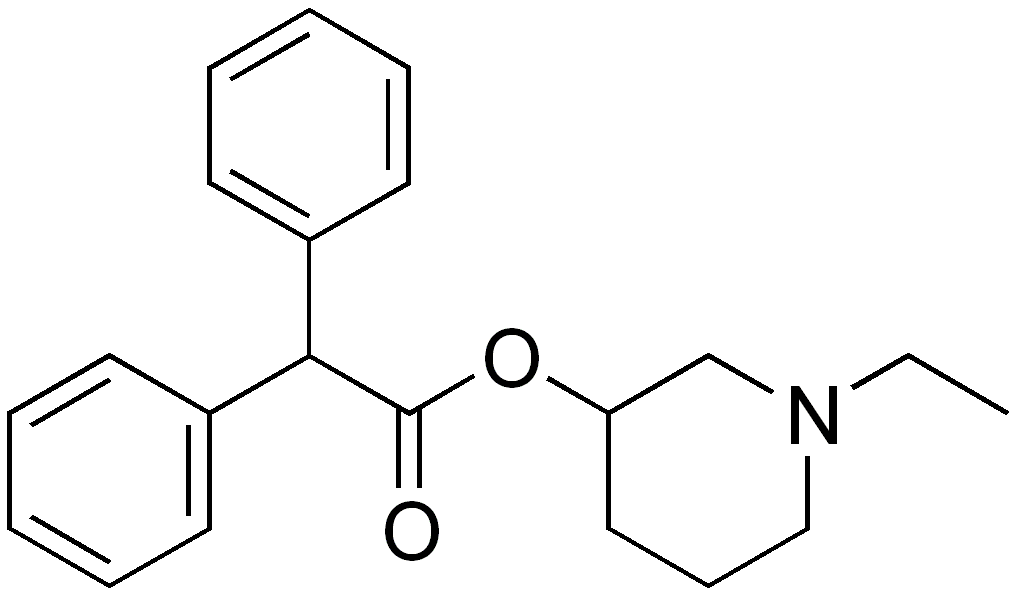

Clinical data
- Trade names: Dactil
- AHFS/Drugs.com: International Drug Names
- ATC code: A03AA30 (WHO)

Identifiers
- IUPAC name: 1-Ethylpiperidin-3-yl diphenylacetate
- CAS Number: 82-98-4
- PubChem CID: 4839
- DrugBank: DB13351
- ChemSpider: 4673
- UNII: RJO31255V9
- KEGG: D08382
- ChEMBL: ChEMBL1474977
- CompTox Dashboard (EPA): DTXSID7048164
- ECHA InfoCard: 100.001.318

Chemical and physical data
- Formula: C_{21}H_{25}NO_{2}
- Molar mass: 323.436 g·mol^{−1}
- 3D model (JSmol): Interactive image
- SMILES: CCN1CCCC(C1)OC(=O)C(C2=CC=CC=C2)C3=CC=CC=C3
- InChI: InChI=1S/C21H25NO2/c1-2-22-15-9-14-19(16-22)24-21(23)20(17-10-5-3-6-11-17)18-12-7-4-8-13-18/h3-8,10-13,19-20H,2,9,14-16H2,1H3; Key:KTHVBAZBLKXIHZ-UHFFFAOYSA-N

Piperidolate is a pharmaceutical drug used to treat the symptoms of gastrointestinal disorders including gastric and duodenal ulcers, gastritis, enteritis, gallstones, cholecystitis, and biliary dyskinesia. It acts as an antimuscarinic agent. It was first approved in 1954 and is no longer marketed in the United States.
