= Pipenzolate bromide =

Chemical compound

Clinical data
- ATC code: A03AB14 (WHO)

Identifiers
- IUPAC name: 1-Ethyl-3-[2-hydroxy(diphenyl)acetoxy]-1-methylpiperidinium bromide
- CAS Number: 125-51-9
- PubChem CID: 657306
- ChemSpider: 571430
- UNII: JPX41DUS2B
- ChEMBL: ChEMBL1401367
- CompTox Dashboard (EPA): DTXSID2023480
- ECHA InfoCard: 100.004.311

Chemical and physical data
- Formula: C_{22}H_{28}BrNO_{3}
- Molar mass: 434.374 g·mol^{−1}
- 3D model (JSmol): Interactive image
- SMILES: CC[N+]1(CCCC(C1)OC(=O)C(c2ccccc2)(c3ccccc3)O)C.[Br-]
- InChI: InChI=1S/C22H28NO3.BrH/c1-3-23(2)16-10-15-20(17-23)26-21(24)22(25,18-11-6-4-7-12-18)19-13-8-5-9-14-19;/h4-9,11-14,20,25H,3,10,15-17H2,1-2H3;1H/q+1;/p-1; Key:XEDCWWFPZMHXCM-UHFFFAOYSA-M

Pipenzolate bromide is a pharmaceutical drug that has been studied as an antispasmodic agent and to treat peptic ulcer.

== Mechanism of action ==
Pipenzolate bromide acts as an antimuscarinic agent. It binds to muscarinic acetylcholine receptors as an antagonist therefore preventing acetylcholine from binding to the receptors.
