= Medazepam =

Benzodiazepine drug

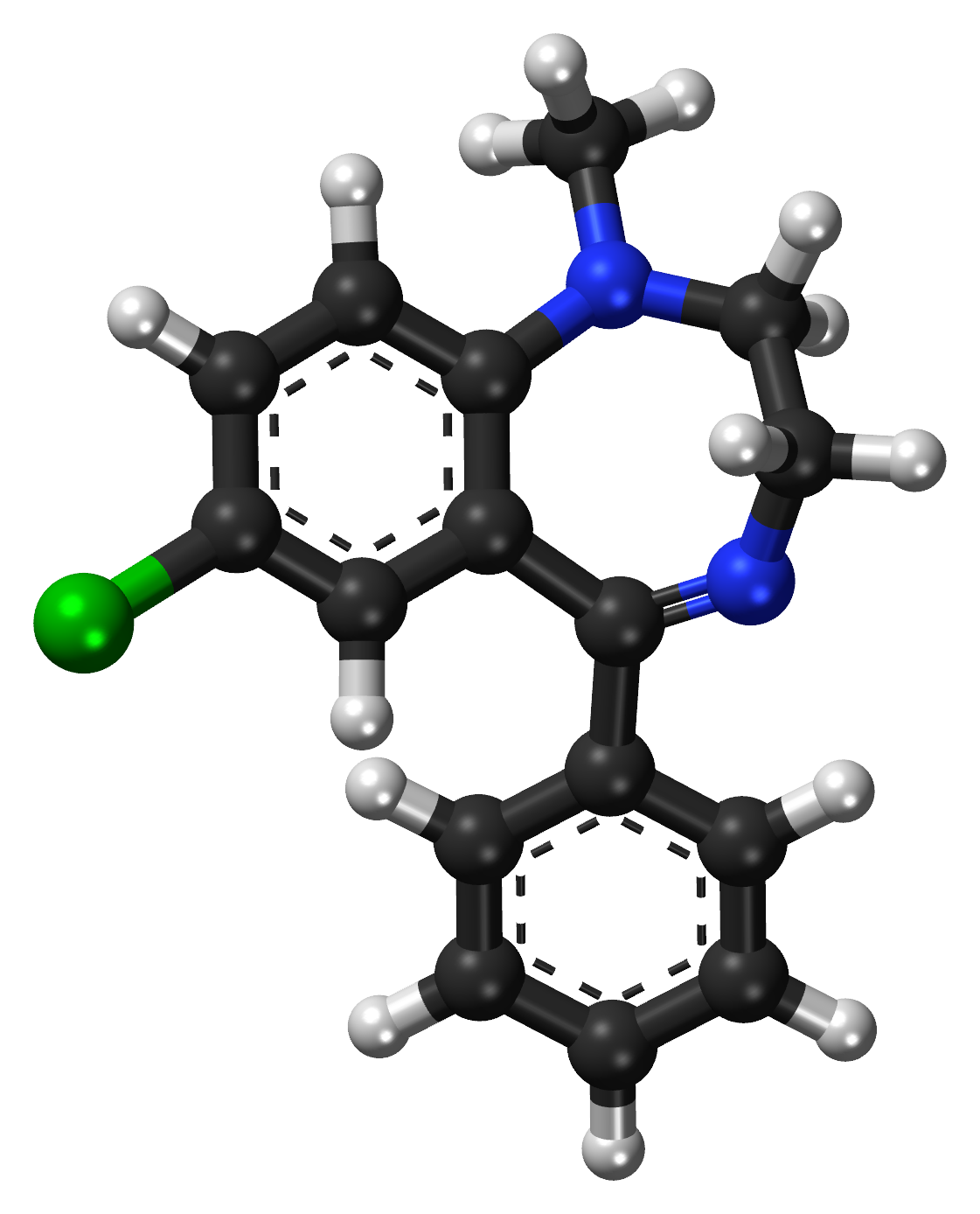

Clinical data
- Trade names: Rudotel, others
- AHFS/Drugs.com: International Drug Names
- Routes of administration: Oral
- ATC code: N05BA03 (WHO)

Legal status
- Legal status: BR: Class B1 (Psychoactive drugs); CA: Schedule IV; DE: Prescription only (Anlage III for higher doses); US: Schedule IV

Pharmacokinetic data
- Bioavailability: 50–75% (С_{max} = 1–2 hours)
- Protein binding: >99%
- Metabolism: Hepatic
- Elimination half-life: 2 hours, 36–150 hours (terminal)
- Excretion: Renal: 63–85%, Biliary: 15–37%

Identifiers
- IUPAC name: 7-chloro-1-methyl-5-phenyl-2,3-dihydro-1,4-benzodiazepine
- CAS Number: 2898-12-6
- PubChem CID: 4041
- DrugBank: none
- ChemSpider: 3901
- UNII: P0J3387W3S
- KEGG: D01292
- ChEMBL: ChEMBL28333
- CompTox Dashboard (EPA): DTXSID1048708
- ECHA InfoCard: 100.018.895

Chemical and physical data
- Formula: C_{16}H_{15}ClN_{2}
- Molar mass: 270.76 g·mol^{−1}
- 3D model (JSmol): Interactive image
- SMILES: ClC1=CC(C(C2=CC=CC=C2)=NCCN3C)=C3C=C1
- InChI: InChI=1S/C16H15ClN2/c1-19-10-9-18-16(12-5-3-2-4-6-12)14-11-13(17)7-8-15(14)19/h2-8,11H,9-10H2,1H3; Key:YLCXGBZIZBEVPZ-UHFFFAOYSA-N

Medazepam is a drug that is a benzodiazepine derivative. It possesses anxiolytic, anticonvulsant, sedative, and skeletal muscle relaxant properties. It is known by the following brand names: Azepamid, Nobrium, Tranquirax (mixed with bevonium), Rudotel, Raporan, Ansilan and Mezapam. Medazepam is a long-acting benzodiazepine drug with half-life of 36–200 hours.

== Pharmacology ==
Medazepam acts as a prodrug to nordazepam. Benzodiazepine drugs including medazepam increase the inhibitory processes in the cerebral cortex by allosteric modulation of the GABA receptor. Benzodiazepines may also act via micromolar benzodiazepine-binding sites as Ca^{2+} channel blockers and significantly inhibited depolarization-sensitive calcium uptake in experiments with cell components from rat brains. This has been conjectured as a mechanism for high dose effects against seizures in a study. It has major active benzodiazepine metabolites, which gives it a more prolonged therapeutic effect after administration.

== See also ==
- Benzodiazepine dependence
- Benzodiazepine withdrawal syndrome
- Long-term effects of benzodiazepines
