= Dihexyverine =

Antimuscarinic drug

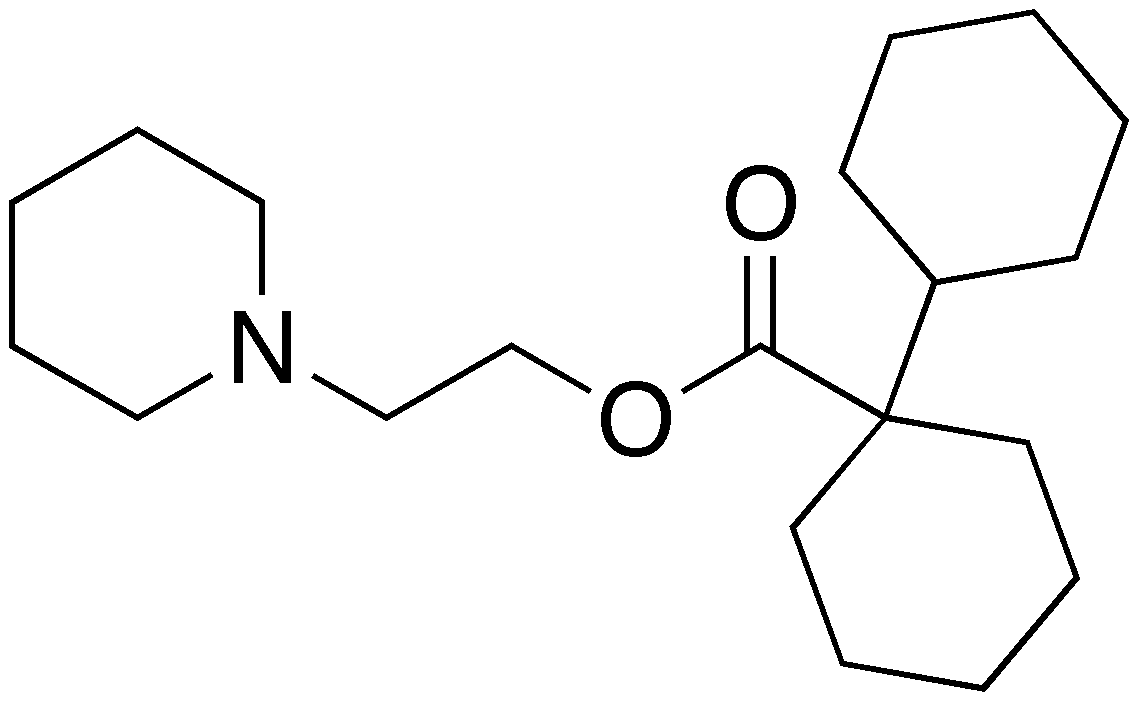

Clinical data
- ATC code: A03AA08 (WHO)

Identifiers
- IUPAC name: 2-(Piperidin-1-yl)ethyl bi(cyclohexane)-1-carboxylate
- CAS Number: 561-77-3
- PubChem CID: 21788
- ChemSpider: 20478
- UNII: J2FQ66RU9W
- KEGG: D07821
- ChEMBL: ChEMBL2106632
- CompTox Dashboard (EPA): DTXSID80204645

Chemical and physical data
- Formula: C_{20}H_{35}NO_{2}
- Molar mass: 321.505 g·mol^{−1}
- 3D model (JSmol): Interactive image
- SMILES: C1CCC(CC1)C2(CCCCC2)C(=O)OCCN3CCCCC3
- InChI: InChI=1S/C20H35NO2/c22-19(23-17-16-21-14-8-3-9-15-21)20(12-6-2-7-13-20)18-10-4-1-5-11-18/h18H,1-17H2; Key:MNSQDVCVWNXBFQ-UHFFFAOYSA-N

Dihexyverine is an anticholinergic spasmolytic. It is not approved for use in the United States but is sold in France under the trade name Spasmodex.
