= Caroverine =

Chemical compound

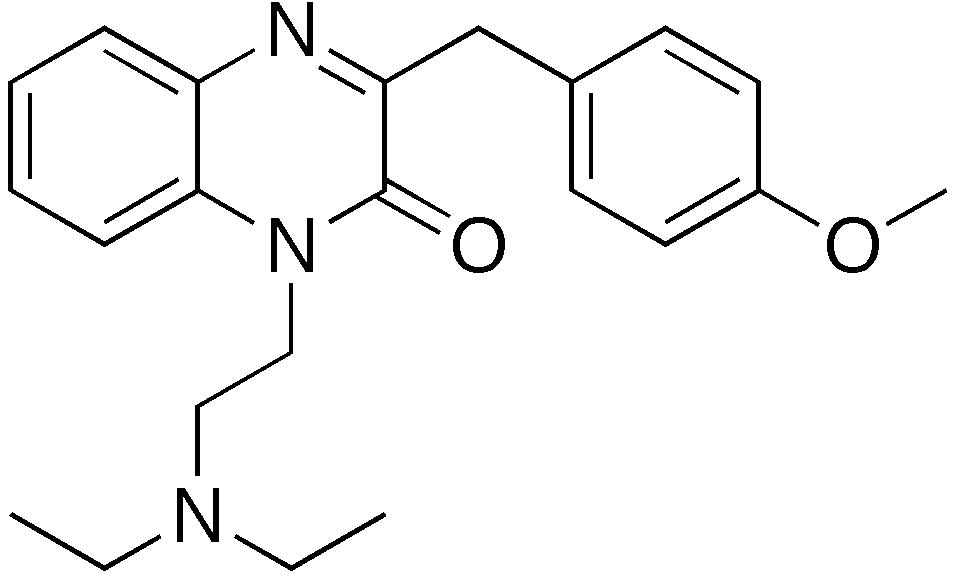

Clinical data
- Trade names: Spasmium, Tinnitin, Tinnex
- Routes of administration: By mouth
- ATC code: A03AX11 (WHO)

Legal status
- Legal status: In general: ℞ (Prescription only)

Identifiers
- IUPAC name: 1-[2-(diethylamino)ethyl]- 3-(4-methoxybenzyl)quinoxalin- 2(1H)-one
- CAS Number: 23465-76-1
- PubChem CID: 65709
- ChemSpider: 59135
- UNII: XJ73B0K6KB
- ChEMBL: ChEMBL1729803
- CompTox Dashboard (EPA): DTXSID6049010
- ECHA InfoCard: 100.164.389

Chemical and physical data
- Formula: C_{22}H_{27}N_{3}O_{2}
- Molar mass: 365.477 g·mol^{−1}
- 3D model (JSmol): Interactive image
- SMILES: O=C/1N(c3c(\N=C\1Cc2ccc(OC)cc2)cccc3)CCN(CC)CC
- InChI: InChI=1S/C22H27N3O2/c1-4-24(5-2)14-15-25-21-9-7-6-8-19(21)23-20(22(25)26)16-17-10-12-18(27-3)13-11-17/h6-13H,4-5,14-16H2,1-3H3; Key:MSPRUJDUTKRMLM-UHFFFAOYSA-N

Caroverine is an antispasmodic drug used in Austria and Switzerland to relieve spasms in smooth muscles, as well as to treat cerebrovascular diseases and tinnitus.

Chemically, it is a quinoxalineone and is available in both a base and hydrochloric acid forms.

== Pharmacology ==
Pharmacologically, it has been described as a nonspecific calcium channel blocker and as an antagonist of the NMDA receptor and other receptors.

== History ==
It was discovered in Austria in the 1950s and was developed by Austrian company Phafag AG.

Its international nonproprietary name (INN), caroverine, was proposed in 1972.

== Society and culture ==
=== Brand names ===
As of 2018, it was marketed under the brand names Spasmium and Tinnitin in Austria, and under the brand Tinnex in India.

== Research ==
An intravenous formulation was tested in a single-blinded study in tinnitus that published in 1997 and had positive results; an effort to replicate those results failed to show any effect, and more people had their condition worsen than experienced benefit. Pilot studies using a spray formulation for tinnitus published in 2005.

In 2010 Phafag licensed rights to caroverine to the Indian company, Lincoln Pharmaceuticals, to develop the drug for tinnitus in India. Lincoln first marketed it for that purpose in India in 2011.

As of 2016 it had been studied in a small clinical trial in people with loss of the sense of smell.
