= Oxyphencyclimine =

Chemical compound

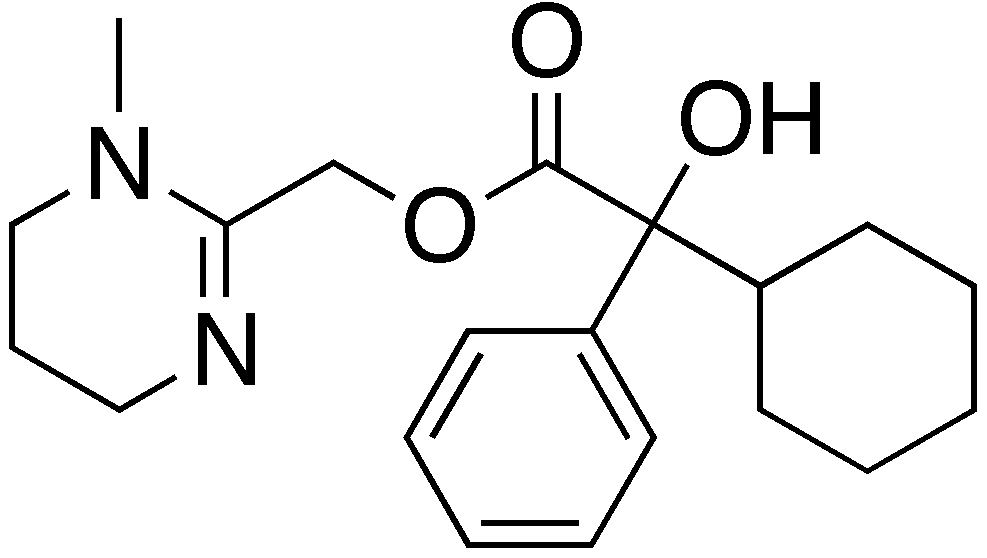

Clinical data
- AHFS/Drugs.com: International Drug Names
- ATC code: A03AA01 (WHO)

Identifiers
- IUPAC name: (1-Methyl-1,4,5,6-tetrahydropyrimidin-2-yl)methyl 2-cyclohexyl-2-hydroxy-2-phenylacetate
- CAS Number: 125-53-1
- PubChem CID: 4642
- IUPHAR/BPS: 7256
- ChemSpider: 4481
- UNII: 4V44H1O8XI
- KEGG: D08325
- ChEMBL: ChEMBL1200891
- CompTox Dashboard (EPA): DTXSID4023410
- ECHA InfoCard: 100.004.313

Chemical and physical data
- Formula: C_{20}H_{28}N_{2}O_{3}
- Molar mass: 344.455 g·mol^{−1}
- InChI: InChI=1S/C20H28N2O3/c1-22-14-8-13-21-18(22)15-25-19(23)20(24,16-9-4-2-5-10-16)17-11-6-3-7-12-17/h2,4-5,9-10,17,24H,3,6-8,11-15H2,1H3; Key:DUDKAZCAISNGQN-UHFFFAOYSA-N

Oxyphencyclimine is a muscarinic receptor antagonist, given orally to treat peptic ulcer disease and gastrointestinal spasms. It has antispasmodic and antimotility properties.

== Synthesis ==
The reaction of chloroacetonitrile (1) with methanol and hydrogen chloride leads to the corresponding iminoether (Pinner reaction). Condensation of 2 with 3-methylaminopropylamine gives (3) gives the corresponding tetrahydropyrimidine (4). Displacement of the halogen with the sodium salt 5 affords oxyphencyclimine (6).

Oxyphencyclimine synthesis.
