= Difemerine =

Chemical compound

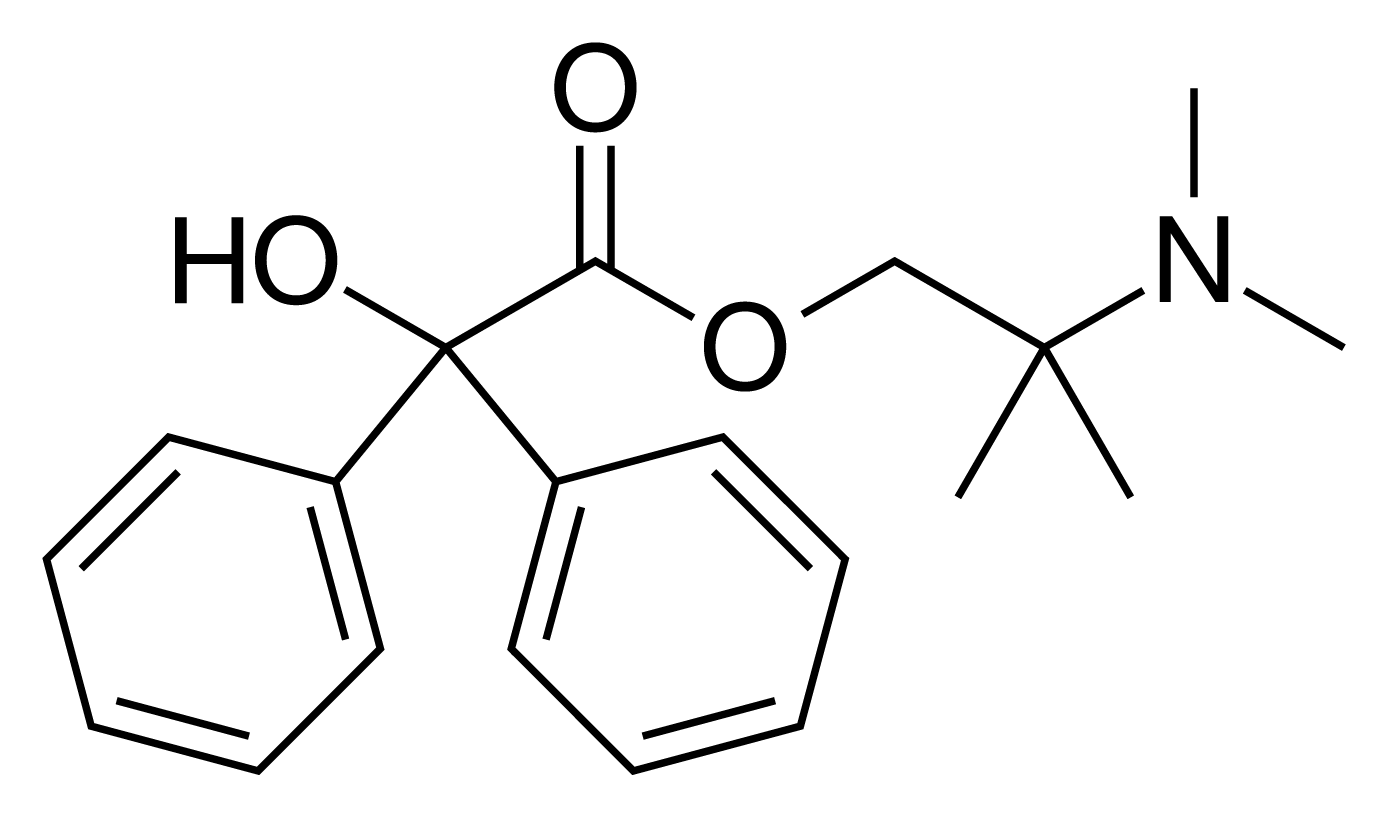

Clinical data
- AHFS/Drugs.com: International Drug Names
- ATC code: A03AA09 (WHO)

Identifiers
- IUPAC name: 2-(Dimethylamino)-2-methylpropyl 2-hydroxy-2,2-diphenylacetate
- CAS Number: 80387-96-8
- PubChem CID: 165124
- ChemSpider: 10662416
- UNII: 843C4UPZ2F
- KEGG: D07079
- ChEMBL: ChEMBL2106534
- CompTox Dashboard (EPA): DTXSID80868569

Chemical and physical data
- Formula: C_{20}H_{25}NO_{3}
- Molar mass: 327.424 g·mol^{−1}
- 3D model (JSmol): Interactive image
- SMILES: OC(C(=O)OC(C)(C)CN(C)C)(c1ccccc1)c2ccccc2
- InChI: InChI=1S/C20H25NO3/c1-19(2,15-21(3)4)24-18(22)20(23,16-11-7-5-8-12-16)17-13-9-6-10-14-17/h5-14,23H,15H2,1-4H3; Key:WJIZVQNUJVMJAZ-UHFFFAOYSA-N

Difemerine is a little known antimuscarinic drug sold under the name Luostyl.
