= Moxaverine =

Chemical compound

Clinical data
- AHFS/Drugs.com: International Drug Names
- ATC code: A03AD30 (WHO)

Identifiers
- IUPAC name: 1-Benzyl-3-ethyl-6,7-dimethoxyisoquinoline
- CAS Number: 10539-19-2
- PubChem CID: 70882
- ChemSpider: 64045
- UNII: P3P08Y1XJ4
- KEGG: D07089
- CompTox Dashboard (EPA): DTXSID6057613
- ECHA InfoCard: 100.031.003

Chemical and physical data
- Formula: C_{20}H_{21}NO_{2}
- Molar mass: 307.393 g·mol^{−1}
- 3D model (JSmol): Interactive image
- SMILES: CCC1=NC(=C2C=C(C(=CC2=C1)OC)OC)CC3=CC=CC=C3
- InChI: InChI=1S/C20H21NO2/c1-4-16-11-15-12-19(22-2)20(23-3)13-17(15)18(21-16)10-14-8-6-5-7-9-14/h5-9,11-13H,4,10H2,1-3H3; Key:MYCMTMIGRXJNSO-UHFFFAOYSA-N

Moxaverine has been used in therapy based on the direct vasodilatory effect of the drug, a phosphodiesterase inhibitor, and on its influence on the rheological properties of red blood cells.

Moxaverine hydrochloride (Kollateral forte®, Ursapharm. Saarbrücken, Germany) has been shown to increase ocular blood flow in patients with age-related macular degeneration, primary open angle glaucoma, and to increase choroidal and retrobulbar blood flow in elderly patients with eye diseases associated with hypo-perfusion. The ocular efficacy of moxaverine has been explored in the clinic.
