= Idanpramine =

Chemical compound

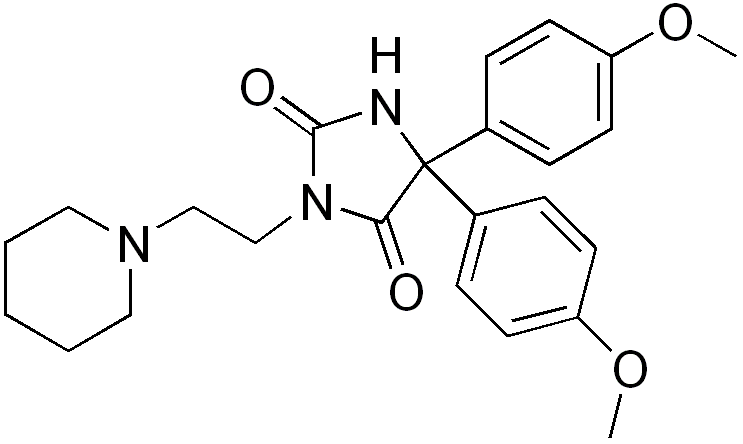

Clinical data
- ATC code: A03AX06 (WHO)

Identifiers
- IUPAC name: 5,5-Bis(4-methoxyphenyl)-3-[2-(piperidin-1-yl)ethyl]imidazolidine-2,4-dione
- CAS Number: 25466-44-8
- PubChem CID: 58521
- ChemSpider: 52728
- UNII: 8WIO2013UA
- CompTox Dashboard (EPA): DTXSID20180151
- ECHA InfoCard: 100.042.724

Chemical and physical data
- Formula: C_{24}H_{29}N_{3}O_{4}
- Molar mass: 423.513 g·mol^{−1}
- 3D model (JSmol): Interactive image
- SMILES: C1CCCCN1CCN2C(=O)NC(C2=O)(c3ccc(OC)cc3)c4ccc(OC)cc4
- InChI: InChI=1S/C24H29N3O4/c1-30-20-10-6-18(7-11-20)24(19-8-12-21(31-2)13-9-19)22(28)27(23(29)25-24)17-16-26-14-4-3-5-15-26/h6-13H,3-5,14-17H2,1-2H3,(H,25,29); Key:HVYGXNYMNHSBGD-UHFFFAOYSA-N

Idanpramine is a drug used for functional gastrointestinal disorders. It acts as an antimuscarinic agent.
