= Propantheline bromide =

Drug for functional gastrointestinal disorders

Clinical data
- Trade names: Pro-Banthine, others
- AHFS/Drugs.com: Monograph
- MedlinePlus: a684020
- Routes of administration: By mouth
- Drug class: Antimuscarinic
- ATC code: A03AB05 (WHO)

Identifiers
- IUPAC name: N-isopropyl-N-methyl-N-{2-[(9H-xanthen-9-ylcarbonyl)oxy]ethyl}propan-2-aminium bromide
- CAS Number: 50-34-0
- PubChem CID: 9279
- IUPHAR/BPS: 329
- DrugBank: DB00782
- ChemSpider: 8922
- UNII: UX9Z118X9F
- KEGG: D00481
- ChEMBL: ChEMBL1240
- CompTox Dashboard (EPA): DTXSID2023519
- ECHA InfoCard: 100.000.028

Chemical and physical data
- Formula: C_{23}H_{30}NO_{3}
- Molar mass: 368.497 g·mol^{−1}
- 3D model (JSmol): Interactive image
- SMILES: [Br-].O=C(OCC[N+](C(C)C)(C(C)C)C)C2c3c(Oc1c2cccc1)cccc3
- InChI: InChI=1S/C23H30NO3.BrH/c1-16(2)24(5,17(3)4)14-15-26-23(25)22-18-10-6-8-12-20(18)27-21-13-9-7-11-19(21)22;/h6-13,16-17,22H,14-15H2,1-5H3;1H/q+1;/p-1; Key:XLBIBBZXLMYSFF-UHFFFAOYSA-M

Propantheline bromide (INN) is an antimuscarinic medication used for the treatment of excessive sweating (hyperhidrosis), cramps or spasms of the stomach, intestines (gut), or bladder, and involuntary urination (enuresis). It can also be used to control the symptoms of irritable bowel syndrome (IBS) and similar conditions. This medication can also be used for patients who experience intense gastrointestinal symptoms while tapering off tricyclic antidepressants.

== Indications ==
By relaxing the gut muscle, propantheline can relieve pain in conditions caused by spasm of the muscle in the gut. Relaxing the smooth muscle in the bladder prevents the involuntary spasms that can allow leakage of urine from the bladder in the condition known as enuresis (involuntary urination in adults). Propantheline can also be used to treat excessive sweating because acetylcholine block also reduces secretions such as sweat and tears.

== Adverse effects ==
Side effects of propantheline include tachycardia, constipation, hypersensitivity to light, dry mouth, and urinary retention. This can also be prescribed by dentists for certain patients who salivate excessively. By giving this medication, it becomes easier to do "dry" dentistry.

== Mechanism of action ==
Propantheline is one of a group of antispasmodic medications which work by blocking the action of the chemical messenger acetylcholine, which is produced by nerve cells, to muscarinic receptors present in various smooth muscular tissues, in places such as the gut, bladder and eye. Normally, the binding of acetylcholine induces involuntary smooth muscular contractions.
