= Chlorbenzoxamine =

Chemical compound

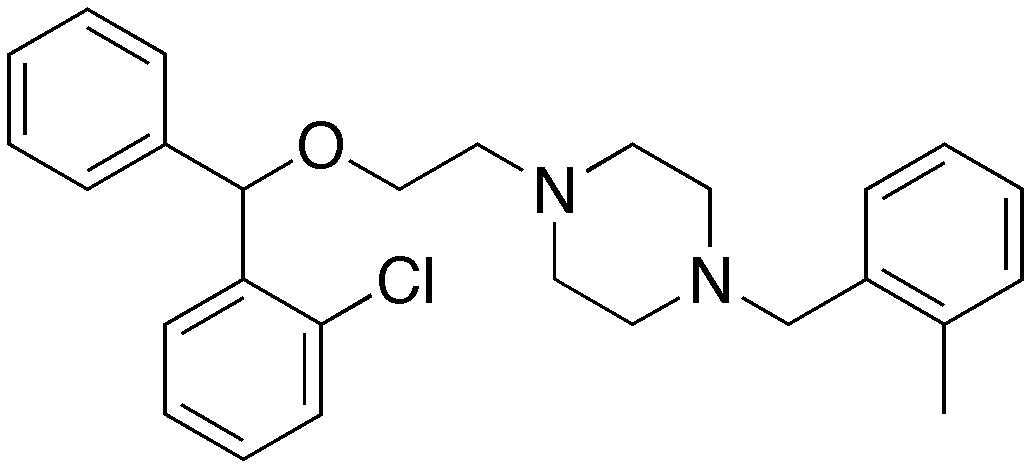

Clinical data
- ATC code: A03AX03 (WHO)

Identifiers
- IUPAC name: 1-(2-[(2-chlorophenyl)(phenyl)methoxy]ethyl)-4-(2-methylbenzyl)piperazine
- CAS Number: 522-18-9
- PubChem CID: 71636
- ChemSpider: 64700
- UNII: N52918SLYN
- KEGG: D07093
- ChEMBL: ChEMBL2110781
- CompTox Dashboard (EPA): DTXSID80862108
- ECHA InfoCard: 100.007.568

Chemical and physical data
- Formula: C_{27}H_{31}ClN_{2}O
- Molar mass: 435.01 g·mol^{−1}
- 3D model (JSmol): Interactive image
- SMILES: Clc1ccccc1C(OCCN2CCN(CC2)Cc3ccccc3C)c4ccccc4

Chlorbenzoxamine is a drug used for functional gastrointestinal disorders.

== Synthesis ==
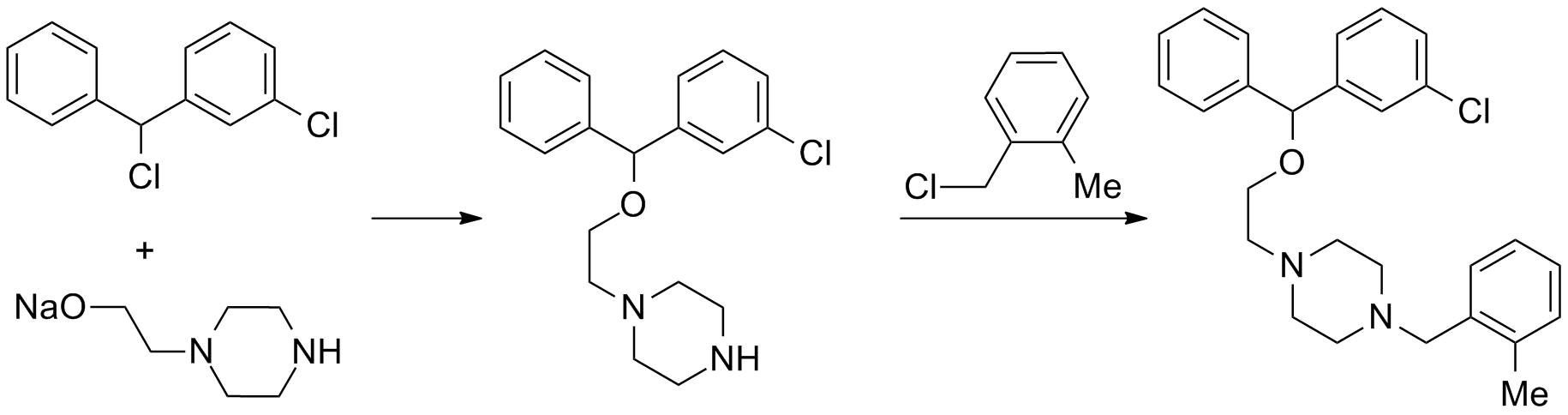
Chlorbenzoxamine synthesis.

== See also ==
- Carbinoxamine
