= Diphemanil metilsulfate =

Chemical compound

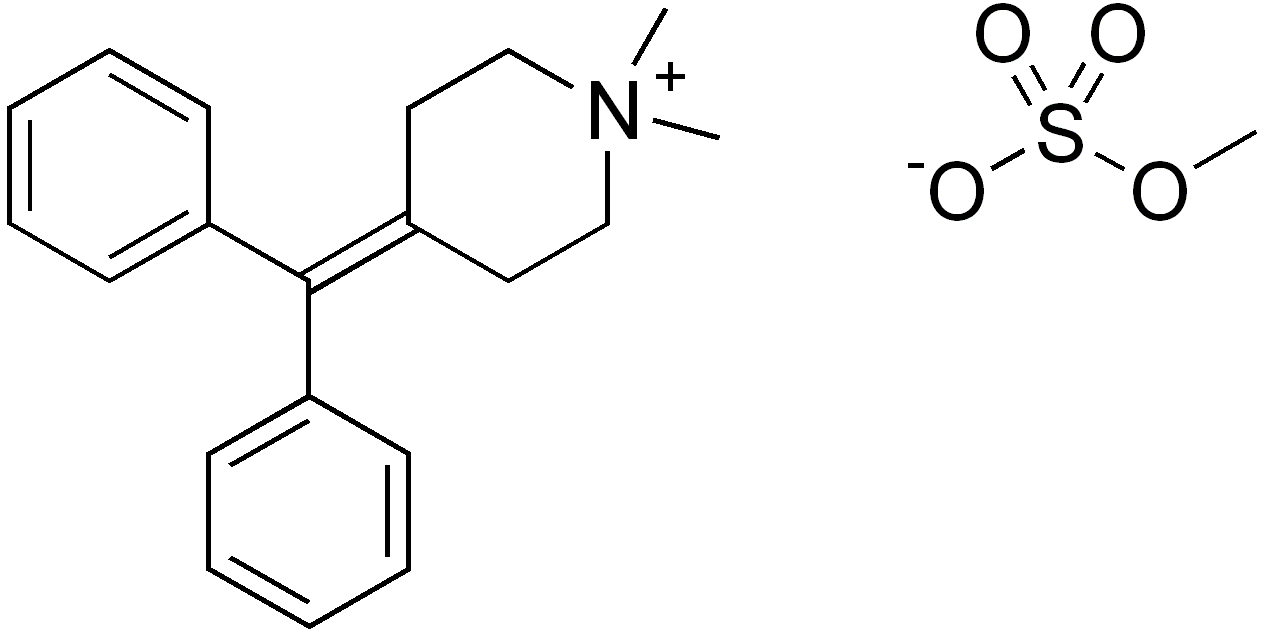

Clinical data
- ATC code: A03AB15 (WHO)

Identifiers
- IUPAC name: 4-(Diphenylmethylene)-1,1-dimethylpiperidinium methylsulfate
- CAS Number: 62-97-5 15394-62-4 (diphemanil cation)
- PubChem CID: 6126
- DrugBank: DB00729
- ChemSpider: 5896
- UNII: W2ZG23MGYI
- ChEBI: CHEBI:59782
- ChEMBL: ChEMBL1200880
- CompTox Dashboard (EPA): DTXSID9022948
- ECHA InfoCard: 100.000.503

Chemical and physical data
- Formula: C_{21}H_{27}NO_{4}S
- Molar mass: 389.51 g·mol^{−1}
- 3D model (JSmol): Interactive image
- SMILES: [O-]S(=O)(=O)OC.c3c(\C(=C1/CC[N+](C)(C)CC1)c2ccccc2)cccc3
- InChI: InChI=1S/C20H24N.CH4O4S/c1-21(2)15-13-19(14-16-21)20(17-9-5-3-6-10-17)18-11-7-4-8-12-18;1-5-6(2,3)4/h3-12H,13-16H2,1-2H3;1H3,(H,2,3,4)/q+1;/p-1; Key:BREMLQBSKCSNNH-UHFFFAOYSA-M

In the field of pharmacology, diphemanil metilsulfate also known as diphemanil methylsulfate is an antimuscarinic (an agent that blocks the action of the natural neurotransmitter acetylcholine).
