= Fenoverine =

Chemical compound

Clinical data
- AHFS/Drugs.com: International Drug Names
- ATC code: A03AX05 (WHO)

Identifiers
- IUPAC name: 2-[4-(Benzo[d][1,3]dioxol-5-ylmethyl)piperazin-1-yl]-1-(10H-phenothiazin-10-yl)ethanone
- CAS Number: 37561-27-6
- PubChem CID: 72098
- ChemSpider: 65083
- UNII: N274ZQ6PZJ
- KEGG: D07095
- ChEMBL: ChEMBL1512949
- CompTox Dashboard (EPA): DTXSID8046296
- ECHA InfoCard: 100.048.666

Chemical and physical data
- Formula: C_{26}H_{15}N_{3}O_{3}S
- Molar mass: 449.48 g·mol^{−1}
- 3D model (JSmol): Interactive image
- SMILES: C1CN(CCN1CC2=CC3=C(C=C2)OCO3)CC(=O)N4C5=CC=CC=C5SC6=CC=CC=C64
- InChI: InChI=1S/C26H25N3O3S/c30-26(29-20-5-1-3-7-24(20)33-25-8-4-2-6-21(25)29)17-28-13-11-27(12-14-28)16-19-9-10-22-23(15-19)32-18-31-22/h1-10,15H,11-14,16-18H2; Key:UBAJTZKNDCEGKL-UHFFFAOYSA-N

Fenoverine (INN) is an antispasmodic [also known as spasmolytics] drug, which acts by inhibiting calcium channels [much in the same way as traditional calcium channel blockers, which are used as antianginal drugs]. In the case of Fenoverine, the relaxation occurs in abdominal / intestinal smooth muscles, while in case of antianginal drugs, the relaxation occurs in coronary vessels. Notably Fenoverine does not act as an antianginal agent.

== Toxicity ==
Fenoverine is known to cause rhabdomyolysis.
