= Methylscopolamine bromide =

Pharmaceutical drug

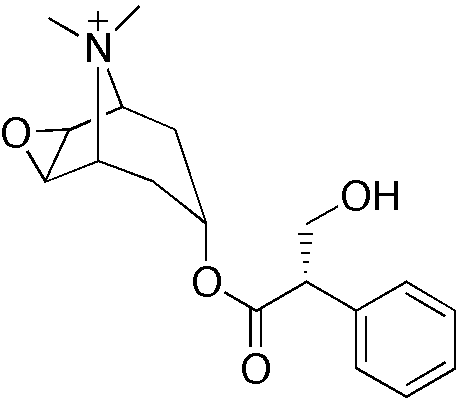

Clinical data
- Trade names: Pamine, Extendryl, AlleRx, Rescon
- AHFS/Drugs.com: Monograph
- MedlinePlus: a606008
- ATC code: A03BB03 (WHO) S01FA03 (WHO)

Pharmacokinetic data
- Elimination half-life: 3–4 hrs

Identifiers
- IUPAC name: (1R,2S,4R,5S,7R)-{[(2R)-3-hydroxy-2-phenylpropanoyl]oxy}-9,9-dimethyl-3-oxa-9-azoniatricyclo[3.3.1.0^{2,4}]nonane
- CAS Number: 155-41-9
- PubChem CID: 441342
- DrugBank: DB00462
- ChemSpider: 21106347
- UNII: RTN51LK7WL
- KEGG: D00715
- ChEMBL: ChEMBL376897
- PDB ligand: 3C0 (PDBe, RCSB PDB)
- CompTox Dashboard (EPA): DTXSID2040608
- ECHA InfoCard: 100.005.314

Chemical and physical data
- Formula: C_{18}H_{24}NO_{4}
- Molar mass: 318.388 g/mol (398.297 g/mol with bromide) g·mol^{−1}
- 3D model (JSmol): Interactive image
- SMILES: OC[C@H](c1ccccc1)C(=O)O[C@H]2C[C@@H]3[N+](C)(C)[C@H](C2)[C@H]4O[C@@H]34
- InChI: InChI=1S/C18H24NO4/c1-19(2)14-8-12(9-15(19)17-16(14)23-17)22-18(21)13(10-20)11-6-4-3-5-7-11/h3-7,12-17,20H,8-10H2,1-2H3/q+1/t12-,13-,14-,15+,16-,17+/m1/s1; Key:LZCOQTDXKCNBEE-IKIFYQGPSA-N

Methylscopolamine or methscopolamine, usually provided as the bromide or nitrate salt, is an oral medication used along with other medications to treat peptic ulcers by reducing stomach acid secretion. Proton pump inhibitors and antihistamine medications have made this use obsolete. It can also be used for stomach or intestinal spasms, to reduce salivation, and to treat motion sickness. Methscopolamine is also commonly used as a drying agent, to dry up post-nasal drip, in cold, irritable bowel syndrome and allergy medications

Methscopolamine, a methylated derivative of scopolamine, is a muscarinic antagonist structurally similar to the neurotransmitter acetylcholine. Its mechanism of action involves blocking the muscarinic acetylcholine receptors.

It was patented in 1902 and approved for medical use in 1947. Methscopolamine is an FDA-approved analog to hyoscine butylbromide.

== Brand names ==
Brand names include Extendryl, AlleRx, Rescon, Pamine.
