= Tridihexethyl =

Chemical compound

Clinical data
- ATC code: A03AB08 (WHO)

Identifiers
- IUPAC name: 3-cyclohexyl-N,N,N-triethyl-3-hydroxy-3-phenylpropan-1-aminium
- CAS Number: 60-49-1
- PubChem CID: 20299
- DrugBank: DB00505
- ChemSpider: 19124
- UNII: 7HE50A367X
- KEGG: C07861
- ChEBI: CHEBI:9701
- ChEMBL: ChEMBL1201354
- CompTox Dashboard (EPA): DTXSID0048553

Chemical and physical data
- Formula: C_{21}H_{36}NO^{+}
- Molar mass: 318.525 g·mol^{−1}
- 3D model (JSmol): Interactive image
- SMILES: OC(c1ccccc1)(CC[N+](CC)(CC)CC)C2CCCCC2
- InChI: InChI=1S/C21H36NO/c1-4-22(5-2,6-3)18-17-21(23,19-13-9-7-10-14-19)20-15-11-8-12-16-20/h7,9-10,13-14,20,23H,4-6,8,11-12,15-18H2,1-3H3/q+1; Key:NPRHVSBSZMAEIN-UHFFFAOYSA-N

Tridihexethyl (which is commonly used as its chloride salt, tridihexethyl chloride) is an anticholinergic, antimuscarinic and antispasmodic drug. It may be used, usually in combination with other drugs, to treat acquired nystagmus or peptic ulcer disease. Many patients discontinue the drug because of unwanted side effects.

It is also known as Pathilon or Propethonum.
