= Tiropramide =

Chemical compound

Clinical data
- Other names: N-[3-[4-(2-Diethylaminoethoxy)phenyl]-1-(dipropylamino)-1-oxopropan-2-yl]benzamide
- AHFS/Drugs.com: International Drug Names
- ATC code: A03AC05 (WHO)

Identifiers
- IUPAC name: Nα-benzoyl-O-[2-(diethylamino)ethyl]-N,N-dipropyltyrosinamide
- CAS Number: 55837-29-1
- PubChem CID: 42262
- ChemSpider: 38541
- UNII: R7S0904CN2
- KEGG: D07087
- ChEMBL: ChEMBL2104688
- CompTox Dashboard (EPA): DTXSID70866514

Chemical and physical data
- Formula: C_{28}H_{41}N_{3}O_{3}
- Molar mass: 467.654 g·mol^{−1}
- 3D model (JSmol): Interactive image
- SMILES: CCCN(CCC)C(=O)C(Cc1ccc(cc1)OCCN(CC)CC)NC(=O)c2ccccc2
- InChI: InChI=1S/C28H41N3O3/c1-5-18-31(19-6-2)28(33)26(29-27(32)24-12-10-9-11-13-24)22-23-14-16-25(17-15-23)34-21-20-30(7-3)8-4/h9-17,26H,5-8,18-22H2,1-4H3,(H,29,32); Key:FDBWMYOFXWMGEY-UHFFFAOYSA-N

Tiropramide is the International nonproprietary name of an antispasmodic drug.

== Synthesis ==

The acylation of racemic tyrosine (1) with benzoyl chloride gives N,O-dibenzoyl-tyrosine (2). Amide formation with dipropylamine (3) using the mixed anhydride method gives the intermediate (4). Hydrolysis of the phenolic ester with sodium hydroxide forms (5), which is alkylated with ClCH_{2}CH_{2}N(CH_{2}CH_{3})_{2} to produce the ether tiropramide.
