= Methantheline =

Chemical compound

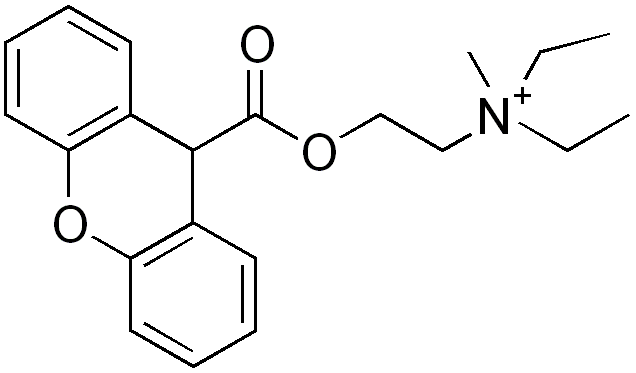

Clinical data
- Trade names: Banthine, Vagantil, others
- Routes of administration: By mouth
- Drug class: Antimuscarinic
- ATC code: A03AB07 (WHO)

Identifiers
- IUPAC name: N,N-diethyl-N-methyl-2-[(9H-xanthen-9-ylcarbonyl)oxy]-ethanaminium
- CAS Number: 5818-17-7
- PubChem CID: 4097
- ChemSpider: 3955
- UNII: 36EI79TX7I
- ChEMBL: ChEMBL1201264
- CompTox Dashboard (EPA): DTXSID7046964

Chemical and physical data
- Formula: C_{21}H_{26}NO_{3}
- Molar mass: 340.443 g·mol^{−1}
- 3D model (JSmol): Interactive image
- SMILES: CC[N+](C)(CC)CCOC(=O)C1C2=CC=CC=C2OC3=CC=CC=C13
- InChI: InChI=1S/C21H26NO3/c1-4-22(3,5-2)14-15-24-21(23)20-16-10-6-8-12-18(16)25-19-13-9-7-11-17(19)20/h6-13,20H,4-5,14-15H2,1-3H3/q+1; Key:GZHFODJQISUKAY-UHFFFAOYSA-N

Methantheline is an antimuscarinic.
