= Oxapium iodide =

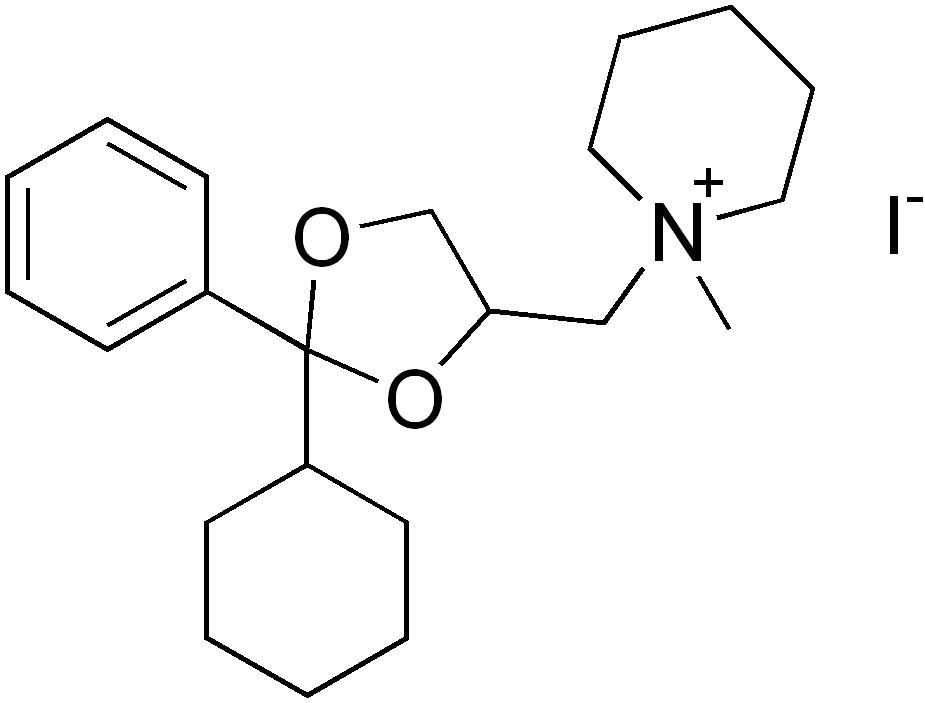

Names
- IUPAC name 1-[(2-cyclohexyl-2-phenyl-1,3-dioxolan-4-yl)methyl]-1-methylpiperidin-1-ium iodide
- Other names Cyclonium, ciclonium

Identifiers
CAS Number	6577-41-9
3D model (JSmol)	Interactive image
ChEMBL	ChEMBL2110800
ChemSpider	147726
KEGG	D01815
PubChem CID	168884
UNII	682380CG4N
CompTox Dashboard (EPA)	DTXSID6046925
- InChI: InChI=1S/C22H34NO2.HI/c1-23(15-9-4-10-16-23)17-21-18-24-22(25-21,19-11-5-2-6-12-19)20-13-7-3-8-14-20;/h2,5-6,11-12,20-21H,3-4,7-10,13-18H2,1H3;1H/q+1;/p-1 Key: YHEWVHONOOWLMW-UHFFFAOYSA-M; InChI=1/C22H34NO2.HI/c1-23(15-9-4-10-16-23)17-21-18-24-22(25-21,19-11-5-2-6-12-19)20-13-7-3-8-14-20;/h2,5-6,11-12,20-21H,3-4,7-10,13-18H2,1H3;1H/q+1;/p-1 Key: YHEWVHONOOWLMW-REWHXWOFAE
- SMILES: C[N+]1(CCCCC1)CC2COC(O2)(C3CCCCC3)C4=CC=CC=C4.[I-]

Properties
Chemical formula	C_{22}H_{34}INO_{2}
Molar mass	471.42 g/mol
- Except where otherwise noted, data are given for materials in their standard state (at 25 °C [77 °F], 100 kPa). verify (what is ?) Infobox references

Oxapium iodide (ciclonium or cyclonium, trade name Oxaperan) is an antispasmodic indicated for the treatment of gastritis, gastroduodenal ulcer, enteritis, and other conditions. It is marketed in South Korea by Dongsung Pharmaceuticals.
