= Poldine =

Chemical compound

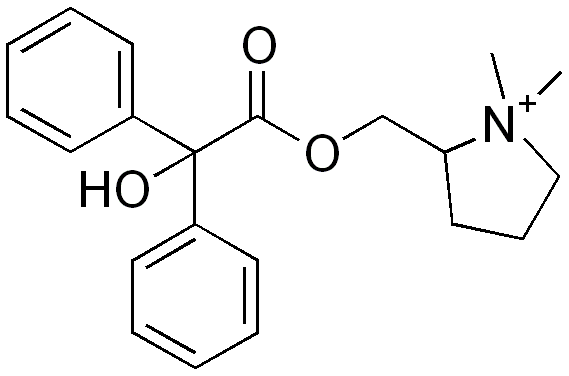

Clinical data
- ATC code: A03AB11 (WHO)

Identifiers
- IUPAC name: 2-[(2-hydroxy-2,2-diphenylacetoxy)methyl]-1,1-dimethylpyrrolidinium
- CAS Number: 596-50-9
- PubChem CID: 11018
- ChemSpider: 10552
- UNII: 8R92106W2F
- CompTox Dashboard (EPA): DTXSID60862161

Chemical and physical data
- Formula: C_{21}H_{26}NO_{3}^{+}
- Molar mass: 340.443 g·mol^{−1}
- 3D model (JSmol): Interactive image
- SMILES: O=C(OCC1[N+](C)(C)CCC1)C(O)(c2ccccc2)c3ccccc3
- InChI: InChI=1S/C21H26NO3/c1-22(2)15-9-14-19(22)16-25-20(23)21(24,17-10-5-3-6-11-17)18-12-7-4-8-13-18/h3-8,10-13,19,24H,9,14-16H2,1-2H3/q+1; Key:CQRKVVAGMJJJSR-UHFFFAOYSA-N

Poldine is an antimuscarinic that is used to treat peptic ulcers.
