= Fenpiprane =

Chemical compound

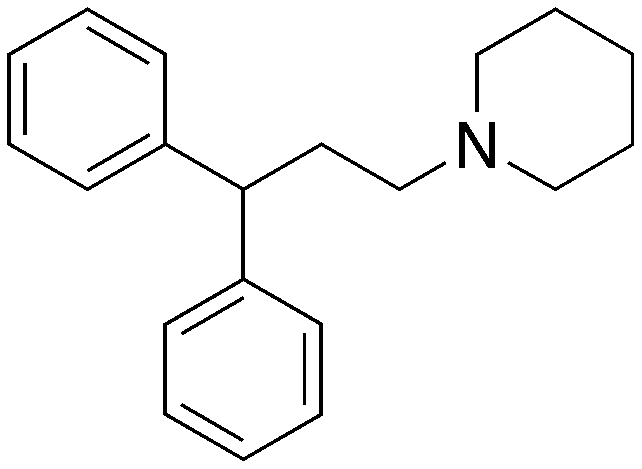

Clinical data
- ATC code: A03AX01 (WHO)

Identifiers
- IUPAC name: 1-[3,3-di(phenyl)propyl]piperidine
- CAS Number: 3540-95-2
- PubChem CID: 197785
- ChemSpider: 171191
- UNII: S2FVB1RL5X
- KEGG: D07091
- ChEMBL: ChEMBL49943
- CompTox Dashboard (EPA): DTXSID10188883

Chemical and physical data
- Formula: C_{20}H_{25}N
- Molar mass: 279.427 g·mol^{−1}
- 3D model (JSmol): Interactive image
- SMILES: C1CCN(CC1)CCC(C2=CC=CC=C2)C3=CC=CC=C3
- InChI: InChI=1S/C20H25N/c1-4-10-18(11-5-1)20(19-12-6-2-7-13-19)14-17-21-15-8-3-9-16-21/h1-2,4-7,10-13,20H,3,8-9,14-17H2

Fenpiprane is a drug used for the management of functional gastrointestinal disorders.
