= Emepronium bromide =

Chemical compound

Clinical data
- ATC code: G04BD01 (WHO)

Identifiers
- IUPAC name: N-ethyl-N,N-dimethyl-4,4-diphenylbutan-2-aminium
- CAS Number: 3614-30-0
- PubChem CID: 71820
- ChemSpider: 64844
- UNII: WZM699L2TL
- KEGG: D07224
- CompTox Dashboard (EPA): DTXSID50875265
- ECHA InfoCard: 100.020.715

Chemical and physical data
- Formula: C_{20}H_{28}BrN
- Molar mass: 362.355 g·mol^{−1}
- 3D model (JSmol): Interactive image
- SMILES: CC[N+](C)(C)C(C)CC(c1ccccc1)c2ccccc2.[Br-]
- InChI: InChI=1S/C20H28N.BrH/c1-5-21(3,4)17(2)16-20(18-12-8-6-9-13-18)19-14-10-7-11-15-19;/h6-15,17,20H,5,16H2,1-4H3;1H/q+1;/p-1; Key:UVKFSMBPRQBNCH-UHFFFAOYSA-M

Emepronium (as emepronium bromide) is an anticholinergic drug used in urology as an antispasmodic. It can cause ulceration of esophagus, so it should be taken in orthostatic position with sufficient amounts of liquids.
