= Methyl bisulfate =

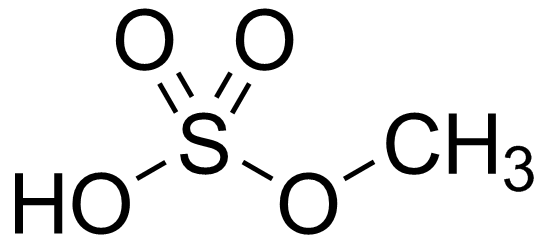

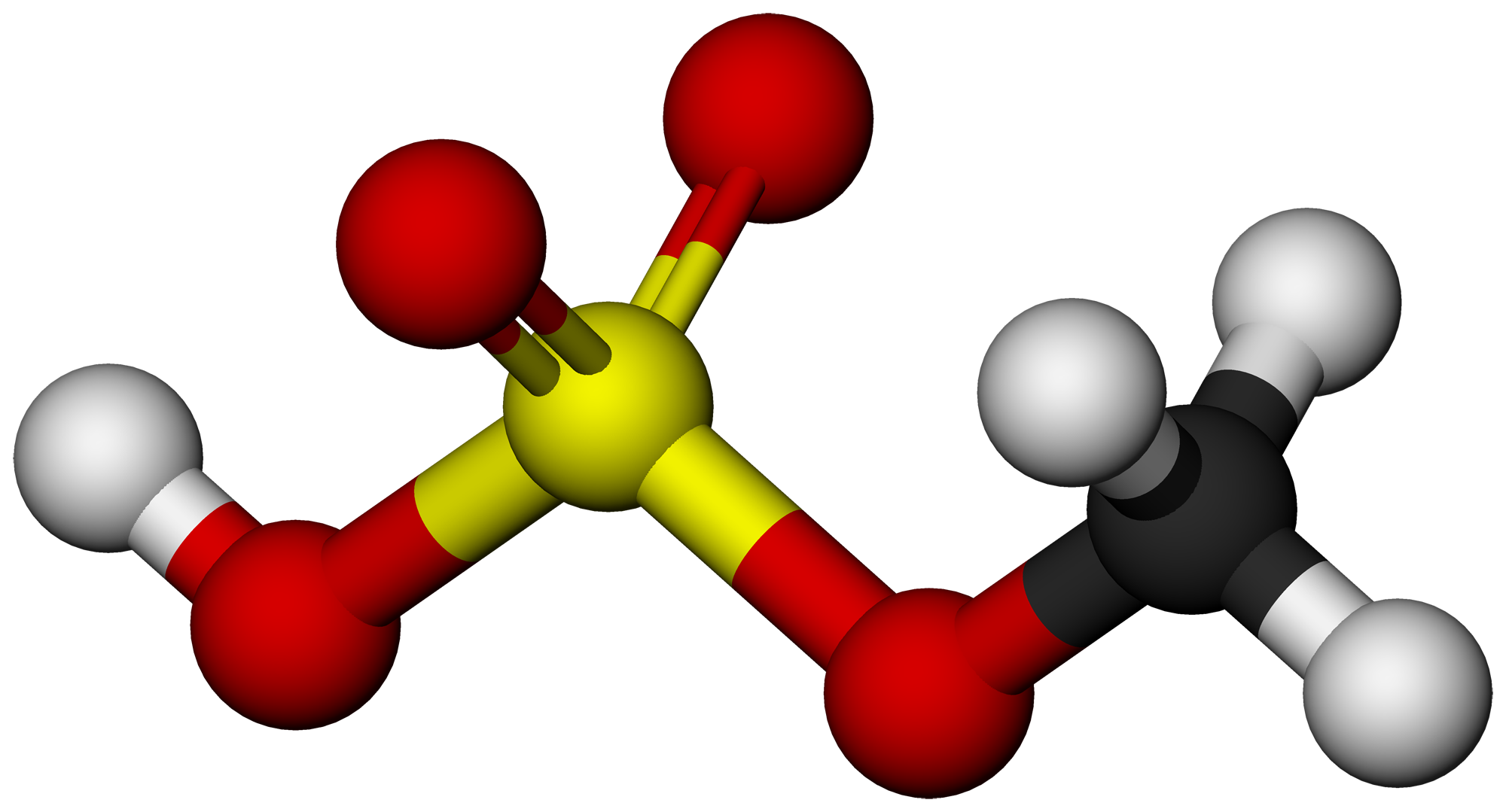
- Sulfur, S Oxygen, O Carbon, C Hydrogen, H

Names
- Preferred IUPAC name Methyl hydrogen sulfate
- Other names: Methyl sulfate; Metilsulfate; Methylsulfuric acid; Monomethyl sulfate

Identifiers
| CAS Number | 75-93-4 |
| 3D model (JSmol) | Interactive image |
| Abbreviations | MeHSO_{4} |
| ChEBI | CHEBI:17760 |
| ChemSpider | 6172 |
| ECHA InfoCard | 100.000.834 |
| EC Number | 201-058-1 |
| KEGG | C00200 |
| PubChem CID | 6412 |
| UNII | R24I7CLU7K |
| CompTox Dashboard (EPA) | DTXSID50891728 DTXSID2047983, DTXSID50891728 |
- InChI: InChI=1S/CH4O4S/c1-5-6(2,3)4/h1H3,(H,2,3,4) Key: JZMJDSHXVKJFKW-UHFFFAOYSA-N
- SMILES: OS(OC)(=O)=O

Properties
| Chemical formula | CH_{4}O_{4}S |
| Molar mass | 112.10 g·mol^{−1} |
- Except where otherwise noted, data are given for materials in their standard state (at 25 °C [77 °F], 100 kPa). verify (what is ?) Infobox references

Methyl bisulfate is a chemical compound with the molecular formula (CH_{3})HSO_{4}. This compound is the mono-methyl ester of sulfuric acid. Its structure is CH_{3}−O−S(=O)_{2}−OH. The significance of methyl bisulfate is that it is an intermediate in the hydrolysis of the important reagent dimethyl sulfate, (CH_{3})_{2}SO_{4}:

(CH_{3})_{2}SO_{4} + H_{2}O → (CH_{3})HSO_{4} + CH_{3}OH

Methyl bisulfate is a strong acid:

(CH_{3})HSO_{4} → (CH_{3})SO^{−}_{4} + H^{+}

Methyl bisulfate came into the public view in 1993 with the discovery that certain mercury compounds catalyze the conversion of methane to methylbisulfate in good yields with excellent selectivity in concentrated sulfuric acid. However, because of the toxicity and concerns with the use of mercury it wasn't until 1998 when platinum complexes were found that catalyze the reaction of CH_{4} by SO_{3} and O_{2} that it came into the limelight:

2 CH_{4} + 2 SO_{3} + O_{2} → 2 (CH_{3})HSO_{4}

This discovery pointed to a possible method for upgrading inexpensive and abundantly available methane (natural gas) into methanol, which is both a more useful chemical and more easily shipped than methane. The process is proposed to proceed via an intermediate containing the Pt−CH_{3} group.

Methyl bisulfate's conjugate base is used as a counterion in the formulation of some pharmaceutical drugs, where it is typically referred to as metilsulfate.
