= First-in-class medication =

Term for a groundbreaking pharmaceutical drug

A first-in-class medication is a prototype drug that uses a "new and unique mechanism of action" to treat a particular medical condition. While the Food and Drug Administration's Center for Drug Evaluation and Research tracks first-in-class medications and reports on them annually, first-in-class is not considered a regulatory category. Although many first-in-class medications qualify as breakthrough therapies, Regenerative Medicine Advanced Therapies or orphan drugs, first-in-class status itself has no regulatory effect.

== Examples ==
Drug	Class	Targeted conditions	Year approved (FDA)	Year approved (EMA)
Inotuzumab ozogamicin (Besponsa)	Anti-CD22 monoclonal antibody-drug conjugate	Relapsed or refractory B cell precursor acute lymphoblastic leukemia	2017	
Tagraxofusp (Elzonris)	Interleukin 3-diphtheria toxin fusion protein targeting plasmacytoid dendritic cells	Blastic plasmacytoid dendritic cell neoplasm	2018	2021
Midostaurin (Rydapt)	Multi-target tyrosine kinase inhibitor not inhibited by the D816V cKit mutation	Systemic mastocytosis, myelodysplastic syndrome, acute myeloid leukemia	2017	2017
Teprotumumab (Tepezza)	Anti-IGF-1R monoclonal antibody	Graves' ophthalmopathy	2020	
Romosozumab (Evenity)	Anti-sclerostin monoclonal antibody	Osteoporosis	2019	2019
Ocrelizumab (Ocrevus)	Anti-CD20 monoclonal antibody	Multiple sclerosis	2017	2018
Ivosidenib (Tibsovo)	Small molecule inhibitor of isocitrate dehydrogenase 1	Acute myeloid leukemia, cholangiocarcinoma	2018	2023
Bempedoic acid (Nexletol)	Adenosine triphosphate-citrate lyase inhibitor	Hypercholesterolemia	2020	2020
Tafamidis (Vyndaqel, Vyndamax)	Transthyretin chaperone (stabilizer)	Familial amyloid polyneuropathy and other transthyretin amyloidoses	2011	2019
Voxelotor (Oxbryta)	Hemoglobin oxygen affinity modulator	Sickle cell disease	2019	
Lonafarnib (Zokinvy)	Farnesyltransferase inhibitor	Hutchinson-Gilford progeria syndrome	2020	2022
Dupilumab (Dupixent)	Interleukin-4 receptor alpha subunit inhibitor	Asthma, atopic dermatitis, allergic diseases	2017	
Lasmiditan (Reyvow)	Selective 5-HT_{1F} serotonin receptor agonist	Migraine	2019	2022
Tazemetostat (Tazverik)	Selective EZH2 inhibitor	Epithelioid sarcoma	2020	
Tirzepatide (Mounjaro)	GLP-1 and GIP activator	adult type 2 diabetes	2022	2022

== Controversy ==
=== Safety ===
By definition, a first-in-class drug does not have the safety evidence from analogous products that not-first-in-class drugs would have. However, a study investigating recalls and warnings in relation to first-in-class drugs approved between 1997 and 2012 by Health Canada has found that first-in-class drugs actually have a more favourable benefit-to-harm ratio.

=== Economics ===
First-in-class drugs are often seen as commercially more attractive as they may tap into a market segment that has hitherto been underserved, but this may be illusory. In fact, most blockbuster drugs (drugs with annual sales revenues exceeding US$1,000,000,000) were not first-in-class drugs. The economic potential of a first-in-class drug, which is typically priced higher than later drugs in the same class, has been largely declining due to efforts by health insurers to restrict what specialty drugs are covered and prevent incumbency advantages.

=== Costs ===
A lower number of available therapeutic options correlates with higher prices. In addition, many first-in-class medications are specialty drugs and orphan drugs, which means that manufacturers have to recoup development costs from a smaller market. This raises ethical questions about the sustainability of the high prices on these costs.
