= Tagraxofusp =

Pharmaceutical drug

Clinical data
- Pronunciation: /təɡˈræksəfʌsp/ təg-RAKS-ə-fusp
- Trade names: Elzonris
- Other names: DT388-IL3, SL-401, tagraxofusp-erzs
- AHFS/Drugs.com: Monograph
- MedlinePlus: a619022
- License data: US DailyMed: Tagraxofusp
- Routes of administration: Intravenous
- ATC code: L01XX67 (WHO)

Legal status
- Legal status: US: ℞-only; EU: Rx-only

Pharmacokinetic data
- Metabolism: Proteases (expected)
- Elimination half-life: 51 minutes

Identifiers
- CAS Number: 2055491-00-2
- DrugBank: DB14731
- UNII: 8ZHS5657EH
- KEGG: D11358

Chemical and physical data
- Formula: C_{2553}H_{4026}N_{692}O_{798}S_{16}
- Molar mass: 57695.30 g·mol^{−1}

Tagraxofusp, sold under the brand name Elzonris, is an anti-cancer medication used for the treatment of blastic plasmacytoid dendritic cell neoplasm. It is a CD123-directed cytotoxin.

The most common adverse reactions include capillary leak syndrome, nausea, fatigue, peripheral edema, pyrexia, and weight increase. The most common laboratory abnormalities include decreases in albumin, platelets, hemoglobin, calcium, and sodium, and increases in glucose, ALT and AST.

Tagraxofusp is a fusion protein consisting of interleukin 3 (IL-3) fused to diphtheria toxin. The fusion protein readily kills cultured pDC by binding to their IL-3 receptors to thereby gain entrance to the cells and then blocking these cells' protein synthesis (due to its diphtheria toxin portion inhibiting eukaryotic elongation factor 2).

It was approved for medical use in the United States in 2018, and in the European Union in January 2021. The US Food and Drug Administration considers it to be a first-in-class medication.

== Medical uses ==
Tagraxofusp is indicated for the treatment of blastic plasmacytoid dendritic cell neoplasm in people aged two years of age and older.

== Adverse effects ==
The most common adverse reactions include capillary leak syndrome, nausea, fatigue, peripheral edema, pyrexia, and weight increase. The most common laboratory abnormalities include decreases in albumin, platelets, hemoglobin, calcium, and sodium, and increases in glucose, ALT and AST.

== History ==
Approval was based on a multi-center, multi-cohort, open-label, single-arm clinical trial (STML-401-0114; NCT 02113982) in participants with untreated or relapsed/refractory blastic plasmacytoid dendritic cell neoplasm. Participants received tagraxofusp-erzs at the recommended dose of 12 mcg/kg (see schedule below) In the pivotal cohort, seven (53.8%; 95% CI: 25.1, 80.8) of 13 participants with untreated blastic plasmacytoid dendritic cell neoplasm achieved complete response/clinical complete response after a median follow-up of 11.5 months. The median response duration was not reached. In the second cohort, of 15 participants with relapsed or refractory blastic plasmacytoid dendritic cell neoplasm, one participant achieved a complete response (duration 111 days) and one participant achieved a clinical complete response (duration 424 days).

== Society and culture ==
=== Legal status ===
Tagraxofusp was approved for medical use in the United States in 2018, The US Food and Drug Administration granted the application for tagraxofusp priority review, breakthrough therapy, and orphan drug designations.

In July 2020, the European Medicines Agency (EMA) recommended the refusal of the marketing authorization for tagraxofusp. The EMA was concerned that due to the design of the study and the small number of participants, it was not possible to be sure how effective the medicine was in treating blastic plasmacytoid dendritic cell neoplasm. In addition, the medicine could cause capillary leak syndrome (an unpredictable, potentially life-threatening side effect due to increased permeability of small blood vessels), which had led to some fatal outcomes.

In November 2020, the Committee for Medicinal Products for Human Use of the EMA adopted a positive opinion following a re-examination procedure, recommending the granting of a marketing authorization for the medicinal product Elzonris, intended for the treatment of blastic plasmacytoid dendritic cell neoplasm. Tagraxofusp was approved for medical use in the European Union in January 2021.

=== Names ===
Tagraxofusp is the international nonproprietary name.

Tagraxofusp is sold under the brand name Elzonris.
