= C23H29N3O =

The molecular formula C_{23}H_{29}N_{3}O (molar mass: 363.49 g/mol, exact mass: 363.2311 u) may refer to:

- Pirolazamide (SC-26,438)
- Opipramol
- Necopidem
- CPM-LAD
- MAL-LAD
- IHCH-7079
