= Pivaloyloxymethyl =

Chemical structure of the pivaloyloxymethyl group

Pivaloyloxymethyl (POM, pivoxil, pivoxyl) is a protecting group used in organic synthesis. The POM radical has the formula (CH_{3})_{3}C-CO-O-CH_{2}.

The POM group is also sometimes used to produce prodrugs. For example, the POM group can be attached to a negatively charged organophosphate group(s) of a drug causing a neutralization of the negative charge, which can allow the drug to become more lipid-soluble and thus more able to diffuse passively across cell membranes into cells. Upon entry into cells, the POM portion of the molecule can be removed by cellular processes resulting in release of the active drug.

Clinically used prodrugs containing pivaloyloxymethyl groups include adefovir dipivoxil, pivampicillin, cefditoren pivoxil, pivmecillinam, and valproate pivoxil. Tenofovir disoproxil contains a very similar prodrug group.

== See also ==
- Pivalic acid
