= Litifilimab =

Monoclonal antibody

Monoclonal antibody
- Type: Whole antibody
- Source: Mouse
- Target: BDCA2

Identifiers
- CAS Number: 2407378-48-5
- PubChem CID: 472406881
- UNII: V27E9V3K7G

Litifilimab is an investigational drug being evaluated for the treatment of cutaneous lupus erythematosus and systemic lupus erythematosus. It is an anti-BDCA2 monocolonal antibody.
