= C17H24N2O =

The molecular formula C_{17}H_{24}N_{2}O (molar mass: 272.38 g/mol) may refer to:

- Bucinnazine
- Pilsicainide
- Quinisocaine, also called dimethisoquin
- UCD0120
