= Pivmecillinam =

Chemical compound

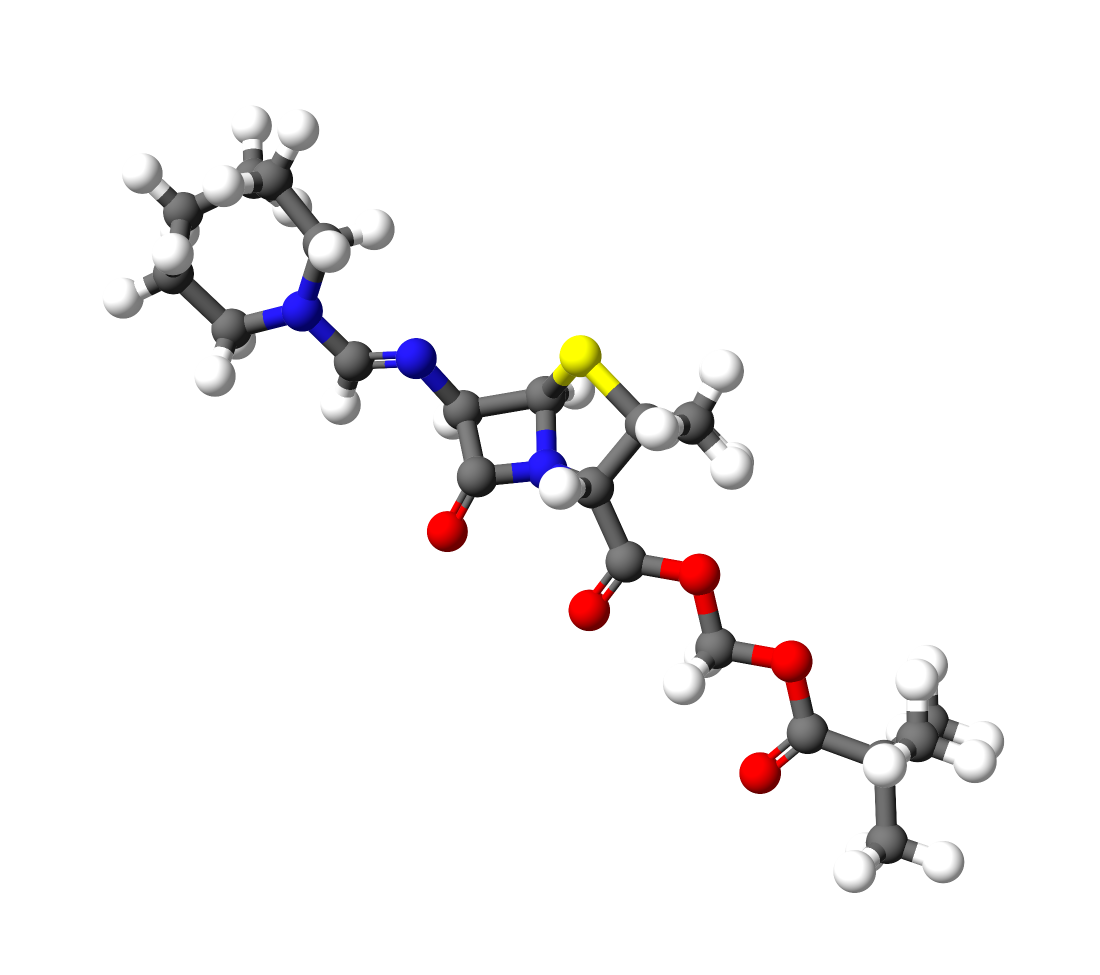

Clinical data
- Trade names: Selexid, Melysin, Coactabs, others
- Other names: amdinocillin pivoxil (USAN US)
- AHFS/Drugs.com: Monograph
- MedlinePlus: a624031
- License data: US DailyMed: Amdinocillin pivoxil
- Routes of administration: By mouth
- ATC code: J01CA08 (WHO)

Legal status
- Legal status: UK: POM (Prescription only); US: ℞-only; In general: ℞ (Prescription only)

Pharmacokinetic data
- Bioavailability: Low
- Protein binding: 5 to 10% (as mecillinam)
- Metabolism: Pivmecillinam is hydrolyzed to mecillinam
- Elimination half-life: 1 to 3 hours
- Excretion: Kidney and biliary, mostly as mecillinam

Identifiers
- IUPAC name: 2,2-dimethylpropanoyloxymethyl (2S,5R,6R)-6-[(azepan-1-ylmethylene)amino]-3,3-dimethyl-7-oxo-4-thia-1-azabicyclo[3.2.0]heptane-2-carboxylate
- CAS Number: 32886-97-8; 32887-03-9
- PubChem CID: 115163; 115162
- DrugBank: DB01605; DBSALT001943
- ChemSpider: 16735658; 19978599
- UNII: 1WAM1OQ30B; 48FX7N21H2
- KEGG: D02889; D01499
- ChEMBL: ChEMBL1650818
- CompTox Dashboard (EPA): DTXSID7048538
- ECHA InfoCard: 100.046.600

Chemical and physical data
- Formula: C_{21}H_{33}N_{3}O_{5}S
- Molar mass: 439.57 g·mol^{−1}
- 3D model (JSmol): Interactive image
- SMILES: CC1(C(N2C(S1)C(C2=O)N=CN3CCCCCC3)C(=O)OCOC(=O)C(C)(C)C)C
- InChI: InChI=1S/C21H33N3O5S/c1-20(2,3)19(27)29-13-28-18(26)15-21(4,5)30-17-14(16(25)24(15)17)22-12-23-10-8-6-7-9-11-23/h12,14-15,17H,6-11,13H2,1-5H3/t14-,15+,17-/m1/s1; Key:NPGNOVNWUSPMDP-HLLBOEOZSA-N; InChI=1S/C21H33N3O5S.ClH/c1-20(2,3)19(27)29-13-28-18(26)15-21(4,5)30-17-14(16(25)24(15)17)22-12-23-10-8-6-7-9-11-23;/h12,14-15,17H,6-11,13H2,1-5H3;1H/t14-,15+,17-;/m1./s1; Key:UHPXMYLONAGUPC-WKLLBTDKSA-N

Pivmecillinam (INN), or amdinocillin pivoxil (USAN), sold under the brand name Selexid and Pivya among others, is an orally active prodrug of mecillinam, an extended-spectrum penicillin antibiotic. Pivmecillinam is the pivaloyloxymethyl ester of mecillinam.

The most common side effects include nausea and diarrhea.

== Medical uses ==
In the US, pivmecillinam is indicated for the treatment of female adults with uncomplicated urinary tract infections caused by susceptible isolates of Escherichia coli, Proteus mirabilis, and Staphylococcus saprophyticus.

Pivmecillinam is primarily active against Gram-negative bacteria, and is used primarily in the treatment of lower urinary tract infections. In the Nordic countries, it has been widely used in that indication since the 1970s.

== Adverse effects ==
The adverse effect profile of pivmecillinam is similar to that of other penicillins. The most common side effects of mecillinam use are rash and gastrointestinal upset, including nausea and vomiting.

Prodrugs that release pivalate anions when broken down by the body — such as pivmecillinam, pivampicillin and cefditoren pivoxil — have long been known to deplete levels of carnitine. This is not due to the drug itself, but to the pivalate anion, which is mostly removed from the body by forming a conjugate with carnitine. Although short-term use of these drugs can cause a marked decrease in blood levels of carnitine, it is unlikely to be of clinical significance; long-term use, however, appears problematic and is not recommended.

== History ==
The efficacy of pivmecillinam in treating females eighteen years of age or older with uncomplicated UTIs was assessed in three controlled clinical trials comparing different pivmecillinam dosing regimens to placebo, to another oral antibacterial drug and to ibuprofen (an anti-inflammatory drug). The primary measure of efficacy for the three trials was the composite response rate, which included clinical cure (resolution of the symptoms of the uncomplicated UTI that were present in participants at trial entry and no new symptoms) and microbiological response (demonstration that the bacteria cultured from participants' urine at trial entry was reduced). The composite response rate was assessed approximately 8 to 14 days after participants were enrolled into the studies. In the clinical trial comparing pivmecillinam to placebo, 62% of the 137 participants who received pivmecillinam achieved the composite response compared to 10% of the 134 who received placebo. In the clinical trial comparing pivmecillinam to another oral antibacterial drug, 72% of the 127 participants who received pivmecillinam achieved composite response compared to 76% of the 132 who received the comparator drug. In the clinical trial comparing pivmecillinam to ibuprofen, 66% of the 105 participants who received pivmecillinam achieved composite response compared to 22% of the 119 who received ibuprofen.

The US Food and Drug Administration (FDA) granted the application for pivmecillinam priority review and qualified infectious disease product designations. The FDA granted the approval of Pivya to Utility Therapeutics Ltd.

== Research ==
Pivmecillinam has been proposed as the first-line drug of choice for empirical treatment of acute cystitis. It has also been used to treat paratyphoid fever and shigellosis.
