= Mecillinam =

Pharmaceutical drug

Clinical data
- Trade names: Coactin, Leo, Selexid, Selexidin
- AHFS/Drugs.com: International Drug Names
- Pregnancy category: Appears safe in pregnancy
- Routes of administration: Intravenous, intramuscular
- ATC code: J01CA11 (WHO)

Legal status
- Legal status: AU: S4 (Prescription only); UK: POM (Prescription only); In general: ℞ (Prescription only)

Pharmacokinetic data
- Bioavailability: Negligible
- Protein binding: 5 to 10%
- Metabolism: Some hepatic metabolism
- Elimination half-life: 1 to 3 hours
- Excretion: Renal and biliary, mostly unchanged

Identifiers
- IUPAC name: (2S,5R,6R)-6-[(E/Z)-(Azepan-1-ylmethylene)amino]-3,3-dimethyl-7-oxo-4-thia-1-azabicyclo[3.2.0]heptane-2-carboxylic acid
- CAS Number: 32887-01-7
- PubChem CID: 36273
- DrugBank: DB01163
- ChemSpider: 33357
- UNII: V10579P3QZ
- KEGG: D02888
- ChEMBL: ChEMBL530
- CompTox Dashboard (EPA): DTXSID3022584
- ECHA InfoCard: 100.046.601

Chemical and physical data
- Formula: C_{15}H_{23}N_{3}O_{3}S
- Molar mass: 325.43 g·mol^{−1}
- 3D model (JSmol): Interactive image
- SMILES: CC1([C@@H](N2[C@H](S1)[C@@H](C2=O)N=CN3CCCCCC3)C(=O)O)C

Mecillinam (INN) or amdinocillin (USAN) is an extended-spectrum penicillin antibiotic of the amidinopenicillin class that binds specifically to penicillin binding protein 2 (PBP2), and is only considered to be active against Gram-negative bacteria. It is used primarily in the treatment of urinary tract infections, and has also been used to treat typhoid and paratyphoid fever. Because mecillinam has very low oral bioavailability, an orally active prodrug was developed: pivmecillinam.

== Medical uses ==
Mecillinam is used in the treatment of infections due to susceptible gram-negative bacteria, especially urinary tract infections which are most commonly caused by Escherichia coli. Mecillinam is active against most pathogenic Gram-negative bacteria, except Pseudomonas aeruginosa and some species of Proteus. Several studies have also found it to be as effective as other antibiotics for treating Staphylococcus saprophyticus infection, though it is Gram-positive, possibly because mecillinam reaches very high concentrations in urine.

Worldwide resistance to mecillinam in bacteria causing urinary tract infection has remained very low since its introduction; a 2003 study conducted in 16 European countries and Canada found resistance to range from 1.2% (Escherichia coli) to 5.2% (Proteus mirabilis). Another large study conducted in Europe and Brazil obtained similar results — 95.9% of E. coli strains, for instance, were sensitive to mecillinam.

== Adverse effects ==
The adverse effect profile of mecillinam is similar to that of other penicillins. Its most common side effects are rash and gastrointestinal upset, including nausea and vomiting.

== History ==
With the codename FL 1060, mecillinam was developed by the Danish pharmaceutical company Leo Pharmaceutical Products (now LEO Pharma). It was first described in the scientific literature in a 1972 paper.
