= Pivekimab sunirine =

Medication

Monoclonal antibody
- Type: Whole antibody
- Source: Humanized (from mouse)
- Target: CD123

Clinical data
- Trade names: Decnupaz
- Other names: IMGN-632, pivekimab sunirine-pvzy
- AHFS/Drugs.com: Monograph
- MedlinePlus: a626072
- License data: US DailyMed: Pivekimab sunirine
- Routes of administration: Intravenous
- ATC code: None

Legal status
- Legal status: US: ℞-only

Identifiers
- CAS Number: 2417174-95-7
- UNII: L15LO3W1XX
- KEGG: D12308

Pivekimab sunirine, sold under the brand name Decnupaz, is an anti-cancer medication used for the treatment of blastic plasmacytoid dendritic cell neoplasm. It is a CD123-directed antibody and alkylating agent conjugate. It is given by intravenous injection.

The most common side effects of pivekimab sunirine include swelling (edema), tiredness (fatigue), muscle and joint pain (musculoskeletal pain), bleeding (hemorrhage), infusion-related reactions, nausea, diarrhea, changes in kidney function tests (increased creatinine), low albumin levels, and changes in liver function tests (transaminases increased).

Pivekimab sunirine was approved for medical use in the United States in May 2026.

== Medical uses ==
Pivekimab sunirine is indicated for the treatment of adults with blastic plasmacytoid dendritic cell neoplasm.

Blastic plasmacytoid dendritic cell neoplasm is an ultra-rare and fast-growing cancer of the bone marrow and blood that can affect multiple organs, including the skin, lymph nodes, spleen, and liver.

== Adverse effects ==
The most common side effects of pivekimab sunirine include swelling (edema), tiredness (fatigue), muscle and joint pain (musculoskeletal pain), bleeding (hemorrhage), infusion-related reactions, nausea, diarrhea, changes in kidney function tests (increased creatinine), low albumin levels, and changes in liver function tests (transaminases increased).

The US prescribing information includes a boxed warning for hepatotoxicity, including hepatic veno-occlusive disease, and warnings and precautions for infusion-related reactions, edema, sulfite allergic reactions, and embryo-fetal toxicity.

Pivekimab sunirine may cause a severe form of liver damage (hepatotoxicity) called veno-occlusive disease (blockage of small blood vessels that makes it hard for blood to leave the liver, leading to backup and swelling), including severe or fatal hepatic veno-occlusive disease (also known as sinusoidal obstruction syndrome).

Pivekimab sunirine may cause a serious side effect called infusion-related reaction, which may be life-threatening or lead to death if not treated. Pivekimab sunirine contains sulfite and may cause severe, life-threatening allergic reactions in some people. Pivekimab sunirine may cause severe fluid retention and harm to an unborn baby.

== History ==
Efficacy was evaluated in CADENZA (NCT03386513), a multi-center, open-label, single-arm clinical trial that included adult participants with treatment-naïve blastic plasmacytoid dendritic cell neoplasm (N=33) or relapsed or refractory blastic plasmacytoid dendritic cell neoplasm (N=51), without evidence of active central nervous system disease. Efficacy was based on the rate of complete remission or clinical complete remission.

The trial included 116 adult participants with CD123-positive blood or bone marrow cancers, of whom 84 participants had blastic plasmacytoid dendritic cell neoplasm. There were 33 participants who had blastic plasmacytoid dendritic cell neoplasm that was never treated before, and 51 participants had blastic plasmacytoid dendritic cell neoplasm that either came back after previous treatment or did not get better with other treatment(s). The trial occurred at 18 locations in four countries: the United States, Italy, Spain, and France. The study included 73 participants in the United States. The benefits and side effects of pivekimab sunirine were evaluated in one open-label trial in adult participants with CD123-positive blood or bone marrow cancers. The efficacy of pivekimab sunirine was evaluated in 84 participants with blastic plasmacytoid dendritic cell neoplasm who received pivekimab sunirine intravenously (through a vein) once every three weeks until the disease worsened or participants experienced unacceptable side effects. The safety of pivekimab sunirine was evaluated in a pooled population of 116 participants who received the approved dose of pivekimab sunirine. This pooled safety population included the 84 participants with blastic plasmacytoid dendritic cell neoplasm as well as additional enrolled participants with other CD123-positive blood or bone marrow cancers treated at the approved dose.

== Society and culture ==
=== Legal status ===
Pivekimab sunirine was approved for medical use in the United States in May 2026.

The US Food and Drug Administration granted the application for pivekimab sunirine priority review, breakthrough therapy, and orphan drug designations.

=== Names ===
Pivekimab sunirine is the international nonproprietary name.

Pivekimab sunirine is sold under the brand name Decnupaz.
