= Pivampicillin =

Chemical compound

Clinical data
- AHFS/Drugs.com: Micromedex Detailed Consumer Information
- Routes of administration: Oral
- ATC code: J01CA02 (WHO)

Pharmacokinetic data
- Excretion: Renal (76%)

Identifiers
- IUPAC name: 2,2-Dimethylpropanoyloxymethyl (2S,5R,6R)-6-{[(2R)-2-amino-2-phenyl-acetyl]amino}-3,3-dimethyl-7-oxo-4-thia-1-azabicyclo[3.2.0]heptane-2-carboxylate
- CAS Number: 33817-20-8
- PubChem CID: 33478
- DrugBank: DB01604
- ChemSpider: 30899
- UNII: 0HLM346LL7
- KEGG: D08396
- ChEBI: CHEBI:8255
- ChEMBL: ChEMBL323354
- CompTox Dashboard (EPA): DTXSID1045459
- ECHA InfoCard: 100.046.975

Chemical and physical data
- Formula: C_{22}H_{29}N_{3}O_{6}S
- Molar mass: 463.55 g·mol^{−1}
- 3D model (JSmol): Interactive image
- SMILES: O=C(OCOC(=O)C(C)(C)C)[C@@H]2N3C(=O)[C@@H](NC(=O)[C@@H](c1ccccc1)N)[C@H]3SC2(C)C
- InChI: InChI=1S/C22H29N3O6S/c1-21(2,3)20(29)31-11-30-19(28)15-22(4,5)32-18-14(17(27)25(15)18)24-16(26)13(23)12-9-7-6-8-10-12/h6-10,13-15,18H,11,23H2,1-5H3,(H,24,26)/t13-,14-,15+,18-/m1/s1; Key:ZEMIJUDPLILVNQ-ZXFNITATSA-N

Pivampicillin is a pivaloyloxymethyl ester of ampicillin. It is a prodrug, which is thought to enhance the oral bioavailability of ampicillin because of its greater lipophilicity compared to that of ampicillin.

== Adverse effects ==
Prodrugs that release pivalic acid when broken down by the body—such as pivampicillin, pivmecillinam, and cefditoren pivoxil—have long been known to deplete levels of carnitine. This effect is not due to the drug itself but to pivalate, which is mostly removed from the body by forming a conjugate with carnitine. Although short-term use of these drugs can cause a marked decrease in blood levels of carnitine, it is unlikely to be of clinical significance; long-term use, however, is not recommended.

== Availability ==
Worldwide, pivampicillin is only available in Denmark, where it is sold as Pondocillin by PharmaCoDane, or Miraxid by LEO Pharma.
