= Adefovir =

Chemical compound

Clinical data
- Trade names: Hepsera
- AHFS/Drugs.com: Monograph
- Pregnancy category: AU: B3
- Routes of administration: Oral
- ATC code: J05AF08 (WHO)

Legal status
- Legal status: AU: S4 (Prescription only); CA: ℞-only; UK: POM (Prescription only); US: ℞-only

Pharmacokinetic data
- Bioavailability: 59%
- Protein binding: <4%
- Elimination half-life: 7.5 hours
- Excretion: Urine

Identifiers
- IUPAC name: {[2-(6-amino-9H-purin-9-yl)ethoxy]methyl}phosphonic acid
- CAS Number: 106941-25-7
- PubChem CID: 60172
- DrugBank: DB00718
- ChemSpider: 54252
- UNII: 6GQP90I798
- KEGG: D02768
- ChEBI: CHEBI:2469
- ChEMBL: ChEMBL484
- NIAID ChemDB: 028595
- CompTox Dashboard (EPA): DTXSID6046214
- ECHA InfoCard: 100.106.235

Chemical and physical data
- Formula: C_{8}H_{12}N_{5}O_{4}P
- Molar mass: 273.189 g·mol^{−1}
- 3D model (JSmol): Interactive image
- SMILES: O=P(O)(O)COCCn1c2ncnc(c2nc1)N
- InChI: InChI=1S/C8H12N5O4P/c9-7-6-8(11-3-10-7)13(4-12-6)1-2-17-5-18(14,15)16/h3-4H,1-2,5H2,(H2,9,10,11)(H2,14,15,16); Key:SUPKOOSCJHTBAH-UHFFFAOYSA-N

Adefovir is a prescription medicine used to treat (chronic) infections with hepatitis B virus. A prodrug form of adefovir was previously called bis-POM PMEA, with trade names Preveon and Hepsera. It is an orally administered nucleotide analog reverse-transcriptase inhibitor (ntRTI). It can be formulated as the pivoxil prodrug adefovir dipivoxil.

== Uses ==
It is used for treatment of hepatitis B.

Trials of adefovir in patients with HIV have not shown any clear benefits.

== History ==
Adefovir was invented in the Institute of Organic Chemistry and Biochemistry, Academy of Sciences of the Czech Republic by Antonín Holý, and the drug was developed by Gilead Sciences for HIV with the brand name Preveon. However, in November 1999, an expert panel advised the U.S. Food and Drug Administration (FDA) not to approve the drug due to concerns about the severity and frequency of kidney toxicity when dosed at 60 or 120 mg. The FDA followed that advice, refusing to approve adefovir as a treatment for HIV.

Gilead Sciences discontinued its development for HIV treatment in December 1999, but continued to develop the drug for hepatitis B (HBV), where it is effective with a much lower dose of 10 mg. FDA approval for use in the treatment of hepatitis B was granted on September 20, 2002, and adefovir is sold for this indication under the brand name Hepsera. Adefovir became an approved treatment for HBV in the European Union in March 2003.

== Mechanism of action ==
Adefovir dipivoxil

Adefovir works by blocking reverse transcriptase, an enzyme crucial for the HBV to reproduce in the body. It is approved for the treatment of chronic hepatitis B in adults with evidence of active viral replication and either evidence of persistent elevations in serum aminotransferases (primarily ALT) or histologically active disease.

The main benefit of adefovir over lamivudine (the first NRTI approved for the treatment of HBV) is that it takes a much longer period of time for the virus to develop resistance to it.

Adefovir dipivoxil contains two pivaloyloxymethyl units, making it a prodrug form of adefovir.
