= Valproate pivoxil =

Chemical compound

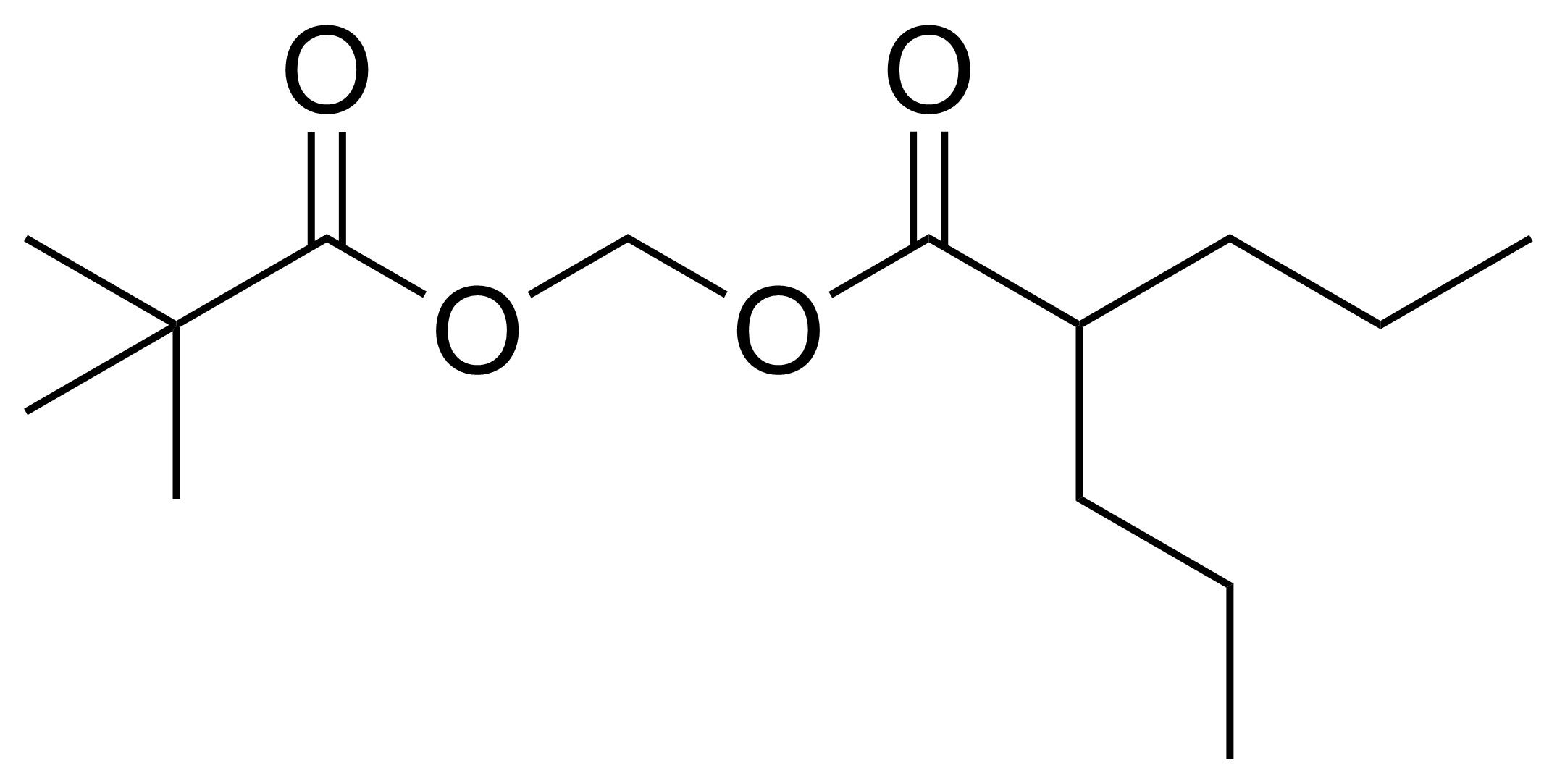

Clinical data
- Routes of administration: Oral
- ATC code: none

Legal status
- Legal status: In general: ℞ (Prescription only)

Identifiers
- IUPAC name: [(2,2-dimethylpropanoyl)oxy]methyl 2-propylpentanoate
- CAS Number: 77372-61-3
- PubChem CID: 71160
- ChemSpider: 64301
- UNII: 9F5A05A29T
- CompTox Dashboard (EPA): DTXSID40228089
- ECHA InfoCard: 100.071.502

Chemical and physical data
- Formula: C_{14}H_{26}O_{4}
- Molar mass: 258.358 g·mol^{−1}
- 3D model (JSmol): Interactive image
- SMILES: O=C(OCOC(=O)C(C)(C)C)C(CCC)CCC
- InChI: InChI=1S/C14H26O4/c1-6-8-11(9-7-2)12(15)17-10-18-13(16)14(3,4)5/h11H,6-10H2,1-5H3; Key:DJEFRLDEQKSNLM-UHFFFAOYSA-N

Valproate pivoxil (Pivadin, Valproxen) is an anticonvulsant used in the treatment of epilepsy. It is the pivaloyloxymethyl ester derivative of valproic acid. It is likely a prodrug of valproic acid, as pivoxil esters are commonly employed to make prodrugs in medicinal chemistry.

== See also ==
- Valproate
- Valpromide
- Valnoctamide
