= CYP-LAD =

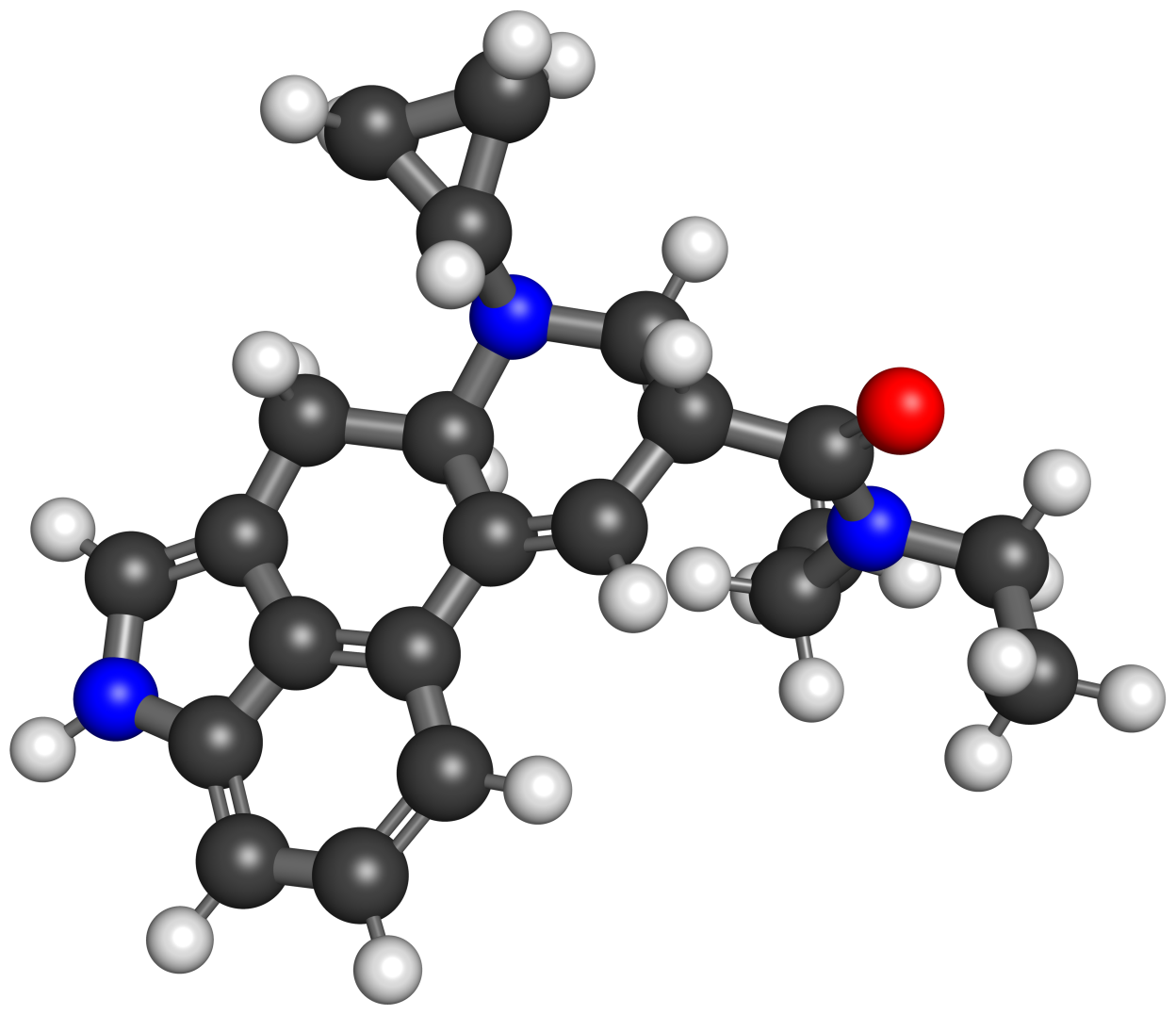

Clinical data
- Other names: N,N-Diethyl-6-cyclopropyl-6-norlysergamide; 6-Cyclopropyl-6-norlysergic acid diethylamide; 6-Cyclopropyl-6-nor-LSD; TRALA-22; 6-Cyclopropyl-N,N-diethyl-9,10-didehydroergoline-8β-carboxamide
- ATC code: None

Identifiers
- IUPAC name: (6aR,9R)-7-cyclopropyl-N,N-diethyl-6,6a,8,9-tetrahydro-4H-indolo[4,3-fg]quinoline-9-carboxamide
- CAS Number: 3024530-20-6
- PubChem CID: 60210039
- ChemSpider: 21106273

Chemical and physical data
- Formula: C_{22}H_{27}N_{3}O
- Molar mass: 349.478 g·mol^{−1}
- 3D model (JSmol): Interactive image
- SMILES: CCN(CC)C(=O)[C@H]1CN([C@@H]2CC3=CNC4=CC=CC(=C34)C2=C1)C5CC5
- InChI: InChI=1S/C22H27N3O/c1-3-24(4-2)22(26)15-10-18-17-6-5-7-19-21(17)14(12-23-19)11-20(18)25(13-15)16-8-9-16/h5-7,10,12,15-16,20,23H,3-4,8-9,11,13H2,1-2H3/t15-,20-/m1/s1; Key:LICTYPNIKGFVGH-FOIQADDNSA-N

CYP-LAD, also known as 6-cyclopropyl-6-nor-lysergic acid diethylamide or as TRALA-22, is a lysergamide and analogue of lysergic acid diethylamide (LSD). It was patented by Daniel Trachsel and colleagues in 2023 as an LSD analogue with modified LSD-like action, and had also previously been claimed in a 2022 patent by Gilgamesh Pharmaceuticals.

== See also ==
- Substituted lysergamide
- CPM-LAD
