= IL3RA =

Human gene

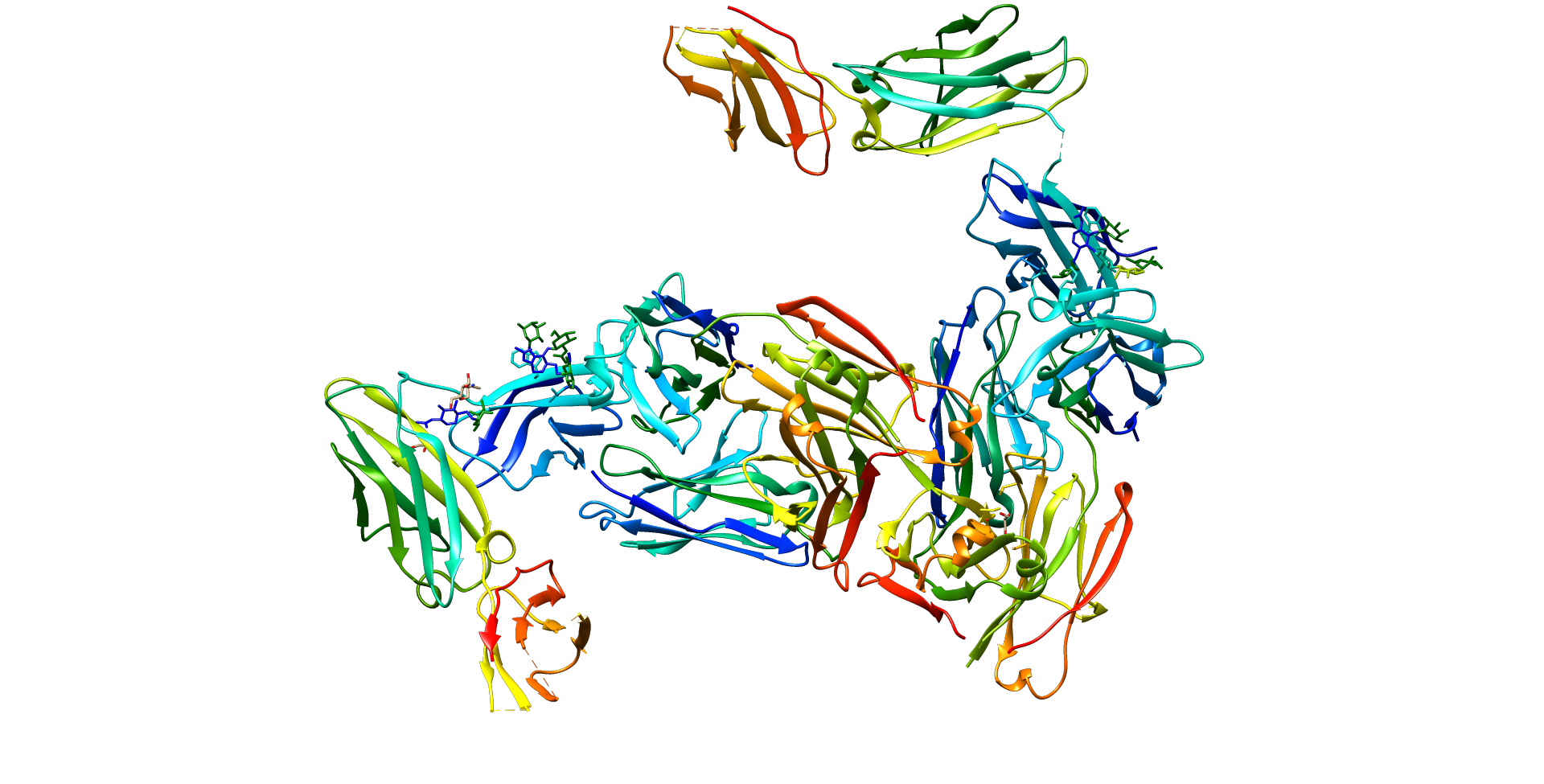

Identifiers
- Aliases: IL3RA, CD123, IL3R, IL3RAY, IL3RX, IL3RY, hIL-3Ra, interleukin 3 receptor subunit alpha
- External IDs: OMIM: 308385, 430000; MGI: 96553; GeneCards: IL3RA
Available structures
| PDB | Ortholog search: PDBe RCSB |
| PDB | List of PDB id codes 4JZJ |

Gene location (Human)
| Chr. | X chromosome (human) |
| Band | X;Y | Start | 1,336,616 bp |
| Band | X;Y | End | 1,382,689 bp |

Gene location (Mouse)
| Chr. | Chromosome 14 (mouse) |
| Band | 14 A1|14 7.08 cM | Start | 8,113,752 bp |
| Band | 14 A1|14 7.08 cM | End | 8,123,488 bp |
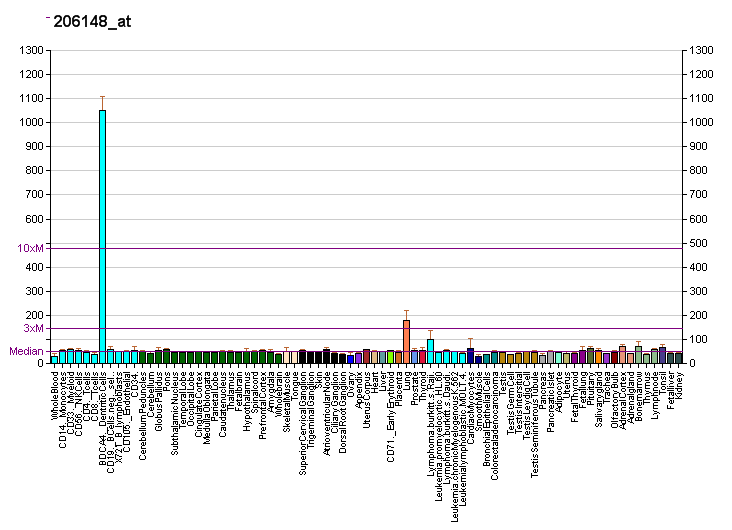
RNA expression pattern
| Bgee | Human / Mouse (ortholog); Top expressed in: right uterine tube; right hemisphere of cerebellum; left ovary; upper lobe of left lung; right ovary; sural nerve; left uterine tube; muscle layer of sigmoid colon; body of uterus; apex of heart / Top expressed in: granulocyte; yolk sac; stroma of bone marrow; embryo; seminiferous tubule; thymus; spermatocyte; epiblast; embryo; muscle of thigh; More reference expression data |
| BioGPS | More reference expression data |
Gene ontology
| Molecular function | cytokine receptor activity; interleukin-3 receptor activity; protein tyrosine kinase activity; cytokine binding |
| Cellular component | integral component of membrane; plasma membrane; membrane; intracellular anatomical structure; external side of plasma membrane; receptor complex |
| Biological process | MAPK cascade; cellular response to interleukin-3; peptidyl-tyrosine phosphorylation; interleukin-3-mediated signaling pathway; cytokine-mediated signaling pathway |
Sources:Amigo / QuickGO
Orthologs
| Databases | NCBI: entry; OMA: entry |
| Species | Human | Mouse |
| Entrez | 3563 | 16188 |
| Ensembl | ENSG00000185291 | ENSMUSG00000068758 |
| UniProt | P26951 | P26952 |
| RefSeq (mRNA) | NM_001267713; NM_002183 | NM_008369 |
| RefSeq (protein) | NP_001254642; NP_002174 | NP_032395 |
| Location (UCSC) | Chr X: 1.34 – 1.38 Mb | Chr 14: 8.11 – 8.12 Mb |
| PubMed search |
- Wikidata
| View/Edit Human | View/Edit Mouse |

Interleukin 3 receptor, alpha (low affinity) (IL3RA), also known as CD123 (Cluster of Differentiation 123), is a human gene.

== Function ==
The protein encoded by this gene is an interleukin 3 specific subunit of a heterodimeric cytokine receptor. The receptor is composed of a ligand specific alpha subunit and a signal transducing beta subunit shared by the receptors for interleukin 3 (IL3), colony stimulating factor 2 (CSF2/GM-CSF), and interleukin 5 (IL5). The binding of this protein to IL3 depends on the beta subunit. The beta subunit is activated by the ligand binding, and is required for the biological activities of IL3. This gene and the gene encoding the colony stimulating factor 2 receptor alpha chain (CSF2RA) form a cytokine receptor gene cluster in a X-Y pseudoautosomal region on chromosomes X or Y.

== Interactions ==
IL3RA has been shown to interact with Interleukin 3.

== See also ==
- Cluster of differentiation
