= Pinoxepin =

Chemical compound

Clinical data
- Other names: Pinoxepine; P-5227
- Routes of administration: Oral

Identifiers
- IUPAC name: 2-[4-[(3Z)-3-(2-Chloro-6H-benzo[c][1]benzoxepin-11-ylidene)propyl]piperazin-1-yl]ethanol
- CAS Number: 14008-66-3 14008-46-9 (hydrochloride)
- PubChem CID: 6436541
- ChemSpider: 4941168
- UNII: Y3YKO9X8N8
- ChEMBL: ChEMBL2110968
- CompTox Dashboard (EPA): DTXSID301136544

Chemical and physical data
- Formula: C_{23}H_{27}ClN_{2}O_{2}
- Molar mass: 398.93 g·mol^{−1}
- 3D model (JSmol): Interactive image
- SMILES: C1CN(CCN1CC/C=C\2/C3=CC=CC=C3COC4=C2C=C(C=C4)Cl)CCO
- InChI: InChI=1S/C23H27ClN2O2/c24-19-7-8-23-22(16-19)21(20-5-2-1-4-18(20)17-28-23)6-3-9-25-10-12-26(13-11-25)14-15-27/h1-2,4-8,16,27H,3,9-15,17H2/b21-6-; Key:RAAHIUIRJUOMAU-MPUCSWFWSA-N

Pinoxepin (INN; developmental code name P-5227; pinoxepin hydrochloride (USAN)) is an antipsychotic of the tricyclic group with a dibenzoxepin ring system which was developed in the 1960s but was never marketed. It was found in clinical trials to have effectiveness in the treatment of schizophrenia similar to that of chlorpromazine and thioridazine. The drug has marked sedative effects but causes relatively mild extrapyramidal symptoms.
