= Pitrakinra =

Clinical data
- Trade names: Aerovant
- Routes of administration: Inhalation, (subcutaneous injection)
- ATC code: none

Legal status
- Legal status: Investigational

Identifiers
- IUPAC name: L-methionyl-[121-aspartic acid, 124-aspartic acid]interleukin-4
- CAS Number: 1017276-51-5
- ChemSpider: none
- ChEMBL: ChEMBL2109159

Chemical and physical data
- Formula: C_{651}H_{1054}N_{190}O_{200}S_{8}
- Molar mass: 14999.20 g·mol^{−1}

Pitrakinra (trade name Aerovant) is a 15-kDa human recombinant protein of wild-type human interleukin-4 (IL-4). It is an IL-4 and IL-13 antagonist that has been studied in a phase IIb clinical trial for the treatment of asthma. Two point mutations on pitrakinra (position 121 mutated from arginine to aspartic acid and position 124 mutated from tyrosine to aspartic acid) confer its ability to block signaling of IL-4 and interleukin-13 (IL-13) by preventing assembly of IL-4 receptor alpha (IL-4Rα) with either IL-2Rγ or IL-13Rα. Upregulation of Th2 cytokines, including IL-4 and IL-13, is thought to be critical for the allergic inflammation associated with atopic diseases such as asthma and eczema. The targets of pitrakinra action are inflammatory cells (dendritic cells, Th2 cells, B cells) and structural cells (smooth muscle, endothelium, epithelium) that express IL-4Rα. The drug has been applied both as a subcutaneous injection and as an inhalation, but the latter formulation proved to be more effective.

== Mechanism of action ==
Asthma results from a dysregulated, hyperresponsive immune response in the airways. Some immune cells in allergic asthmatics respond aggressively to foreign allergens with the release of IL-4 and 13, two key mediators that initiate a cycle of inflammation in the lung. Pitrakinra is an antagonist of the interleukin-4 receptor alpha chain, a protein that is also part of IL-13. It thereby blocks the inflammatory effects of IL-4 and IL-13, interrupting the Th2 lymphocyte immune response.

Pitrakinra protects allergic cynomolgus monkeys from allergen-induced airways hyper-responsiveness and lung eosinophilia in both prophylactic and therapeutic model settings. Subcutaneous injection of pitrakinra in human patients with severe atopic eczema for 4 weeks or more decreases the eczema clinical score and circulating IgE concentrations, and normalized T-cell subsets. Decreases in Forced Expiratory Volume in 1 s (FEV1) after allergen challenge after 4 weeks of inhalation of pitrakinra supports the hypothesis that dual inhibition of IL-4 and IL-13 can affect the course of the late asthmatic response after experimental allergen challenge. The reduced frequency of spontaneous asthma attacks requiring rescue medication use suggests that the use of pitrakinra improves the control over asthma symptoms.

In addition to improvements in the late asthmatic response, measurement of Fractional Expiratory Nitric Oxide (FENO) indicates that the resting inflammatory status of the lungs is significantly attenuated after inhalation of pitrakinra for 4 weeks. This result supports observations that IL-4 and other pro-inflammatory mediators induce nitric oxide synthase (iNOS) through STAT1 and STAT6 in epithelial cells. Basal FENO could be more dependent on up-regulation of iNOS by IL-4 and IL-13, whereas the increase in FENO after allergen challenge could involve additional pathways in epithelial cells and perhaps macrophages that are not affected by the inhibition of IL-4Rα. Pitrakinra may down-regulate baseline Th2 inflammation in the asthmatic lung while not interfering with the lung's natural defenses in contact with large amounts of foreign allergen.

== Adverse events ==
Pitrakinra is associated with few adverse effect, whether administered by subcutaneous injection or by inhalation in participants with atopic asthma or atopic eczema. The most common adverse event after subcutaneous administration is injection site-related discomfort, a common event with most injectable drugs. However, these events are neither associated with the development of antibodies nor with any discernible pattern (i.e., they were not more common at the end of the 4 weeks of exposure). There are also fewer spontaneous asthma attacks and respiratory-related adverse events that require rescue medication in participants who received pitrakinra subcutaneously than in those in the placebo group.
