= Pirolate =

Chemical compound

Clinical data
- Routes of administration: Oral
- ATC code: none

Legal status
- Legal status: ?

Identifiers
- IUPAC name: ethyl 7,8-dimethoxy-4-oxo-1,4-dihydropyrimido[4,5-b]quinoline-2-carboxylate
- CAS Number: 55149-05-8
- PubChem CID: 5361200
- ChemSpider: 4514698
- UNII: 2LF7L6QD58
- KEGG: D05508
- CompTox Dashboard (EPA): DTXSID50203660

Chemical and physical data
- Formula: C_{16}H_{15}N_{3}O_{5}
- Molar mass: 329.312 g·mol^{−1}
- 3D model (JSmol): Interactive image
- SMILES: O=C(OCC)C/1=N/C(=O)c2cc3cc(OC)c(OC)cc3nc2N\1

Pirolate (CP-32,387) is an antihistamine drug with a tricyclic chemical structure which was patented as an "antiallergen". It was never marketed and there are very few references to it in the literature.
