= Pirquinozol =

Chemical compound

Clinical data
- Routes of administration: Oral
- ATC code: none

Legal status
- Legal status: In general: uncontrolled

Identifiers
- IUPAC name: 2-(hydroxymethyl)pyrazolo[1,5-c]quinazolin-5(6H)-one
- CAS Number: 65950-99-4
- PubChem CID: 47783
- ChemSpider: 11317704
- UNII: D16HG4V2UC
- KEGG: D05516
- CompTox Dashboard (EPA): DTXSID00984432

Chemical and physical data
- Formula: C_{11}H_{9}N_{3}O_{2}
- Molar mass: 215.212 g·mol^{−1}
- 3D model (JSmol): Interactive image
- SMILES: OCc1cc2c3ccccc3NC(=O)n2n1

Pirquinozol (SQ-13,847) is a drug which was investigated as an antiallergen and antiasthmatic agent in the early 1980s but was never marketed. Notably, pirquinozol is not an antihistamine, though it does block the release of histamine evoked by allergens, and it does not bind to β-adrenergic receptors either.
