= Pirlimycin =

Chemical compound

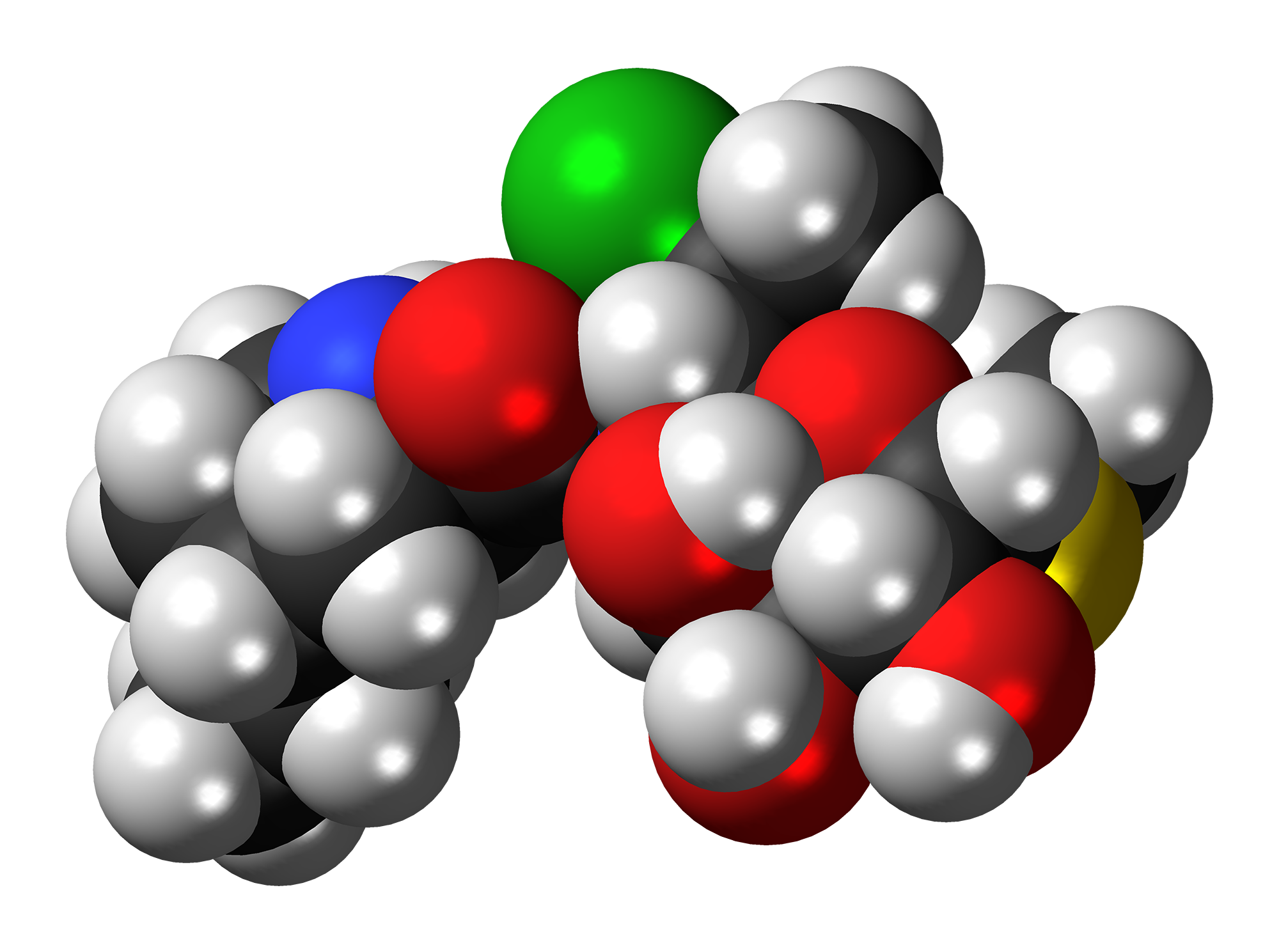

Clinical data
- Trade names: Pirsue
- Routes of administration: Intramammary
- ATCvet code: QJ51FF90 (WHO)

Legal status
- Legal status: EU: Rx-only

Identifiers
- IUPAC name: Methyl (2S-cis)-7-chloro-6,7,8-trideoxy-6[[(4-ethyl-2-piperidinyl)carbonyl]amino]-1-thio-L-threo-α-D-galacto-octopyranoside
- CAS Number: 79548-73-5
- ChemSpider: 138508
- UNII: LM19JT6G5K; 8S09O559AQ
- KEGG: D08391; D05501
- ChEMBL: ChEMBL1652611; ChEMBL3989899
- CompTox Dashboard (EPA): DTXSID30904249

Chemical and physical data
- Formula: C_{17}H_{31}ClN_{2}O_{5}S
- Molar mass: 410.95 g·mol^{−1}
- 3D model (JSmol): Interactive image
- SMILES: CC[C@@H]1CCN[C@@H](C1)C(=O)N[C@@H]([C@@H]2[C@@H]([C@@H]([C@H]([C@H](O2)SC)O)O)O)[C@H](C)Cl
- InChI: InChI=1S/C17H31ClN2O5S/c1-4-9-5-6-19-10(7-9)16(24)20-11(8(2)18)15-13(22)12(21)14(23)17(25-15)26-3/h8-15,17,19,21-23H,4-7H2,1-3H3,(H,20,24)/t8-,9+,10-,11+,12-,13+,14+,15+,17+/m0/s1; Key:HBJOXQRURQPDEX-MHXMMLMNSA-N; Key:CHAZSEMQYSZBFN-RWMVMHIMSA-N

Pirlimycin, sold under the brand name Pirsue, is used in the treatment of mastitis in cattle. It is used as the salt pirlimycin hydrochloride and it belongs to the lincosamide class of antimicrobials.

== Activity ==
Pirlimycin is active against Gram-positive bacteria, specifically Staphylococcus aureus and coagulase negative species of Staphylococcus and Streptococcus. It has no activity against Gram-negative bacteria.

== Mechanism of action ==
It is bacteriostatic and acts by inhibiting bacterial protein synthesis via binding with the 50S subunit of the ribosome.
