= Pildralazine =

Chemical compound

Clinical data
- Other names: ISF-2123
- Routes of administration: Oral
- ATC code: None

Legal status
- Legal status: In general: ℞ (Prescription only)

Identifiers
- IUPAC name: 1-[(6-Hydrazinylpyridazin-3-yl)(methyl)amino]propan-2-ol
- CAS Number: 64000-73-3
- PubChem CID: 68829
- ChemSpider: 62062
- UNII: FU2BGC781U
- CompTox Dashboard (EPA): DTXSID7043746

Chemical and physical data
- Formula: C_{8}H_{15}N_{5}O
- Molar mass: 197.242 g·mol^{−1}
- 3D model (JSmol): Interactive image
- SMILES: n1nc(NN)ccc1N(C)CC(O)C
- InChI: InChI=1S/C8H15N5O/c1-6(14)5-13(2)8-4-3-7(10-9)11-12-8/h3-4,6,14H,5,9H2,1-2H3,(H,10,11); Key:KYIAWOXNPBANEW-UHFFFAOYSA-N

Pildralazine (Atensil), also known as propyldazine or propildazine, is an antihypertensive and vasodilator.

== Synthesis ==
Thieme Synthesis: Patent:

The reaction between 3,6-Dichloropyridazine [141-30-0] (1) and 1-(Methylamino)-2-propanol [16667-45-1] (2) gives CID:12237595 (3). Reaction with hydrazine completes the synthesis of Pidralazine (4).
