= Interleukin-3 receptor =

Mammalian protein found in Homo sapiens

interleukin 3 receptor, alpha
- green: Interleukin-3 receptor, grey: interleukin-3

Identifiers
- Symbol: IL3RA
- Alt. symbols: CD123
- HGNC: 6012
- OMIM: 308385

Other data
- Locus: Chr. X p22.3

interleukin 3 receptor, Y-Chromosomal

Identifiers
- Symbol: IL3RA
- Alt. symbols: IL3RY, IL3RAY
- NCBI gene: 3563
- HGNC: 6012
- OMIM: 430000

Other data
- Locus: Chr. Y p11.3

The interleukin-3 receptor (CD123) is a molecule found on cells which helps transmit the signal of interleukin-3, a soluble cytokine important in the immune system.

The gene coding for the receptor is located in the pseudoautosomal region of the X and Y chromosomes.

The receptor belongs to the type I cytokine receptor family and is a heterodimer with a unique alpha chain paired with the common beta (beta c or CD131) subunit.

The gene for the alpha subunit is 40 kilobases long and has 12 exons.

== Cell types and function ==
The receptor, found on pluripotent progenitor cells, induces tyrosine phosphorylation within the cell and promotes proliferation and differentiation within the hematopoietic cell lines. It can be found on basophils and pDCs as well as some cDCs among peripheral blood mononuclear cells.

CD123 is expressed across acute myeloid leukemia (AML) subtypes, including leukemic stem cells.

== Possible drug target ==
Tagraxofusp, human IL-3 fused to diphtheria toxin, is an approved treatment for BPDCN. An experimental antibody-drug conjugate SGN-CD123A targets CD123 as a possible treatment for AML.
