= Pipramadol =

Clinical data
- Other names: FQ 27-096

Identifiers
- IUPAC name: 2-[1-[2-(2-Chlorophenyl)ethyl]-4-hydroxypiperidin-4-yl]-N-cyclohexyl-N-methylpropanamide
- CAS Number: 55313-67-2
- PubChem CID: 3047849
- ChemSpider: 2310156
- UNII: 24HB54N554
- ChEMBL: ChEMBL146727
- CompTox Dashboard (EPA): DTXSID40866480

Chemical and physical data
- Formula: C_{23}H_{35}ClN_{2}O_{2}
- Molar mass: 407.00 g·mol^{−1}
- 3D model (JSmol): Interactive image
- SMILES: CC(C(=O)N(C)C1CCCCC1)C2(CCN(CC2)CCC3=CC=CC=C3Cl)O
- InChI: InChI=1S/C23H35ClN2O2/c1-18(22(27)25(2)20-9-4-3-5-10-20)23(28)13-16-26(17-14-23)15-12-19-8-6-7-11-21(19)24/h6-8,11,18,20,28H,3-5,9-10,12-17H2,1-2H3; Key:JRLWHJKUNYBJRC-UHFFFAOYSA-N

Pipramadol is an opioid narcotic with potent analgesic properties.

== See also ==
- Pipradimadol
