= Pipradimadol =

Clinical data
- Other names: FU 29-245

Identifiers
- IUPAC name: 2-[1-[2-(2-Chlorophenyl)ethyl]-4-hydroxypiperidin-4-yl]-N-cyclohexyl-N,2-dimethylpropanamide
- CAS Number: 68797-29-5
- PubChem CID: 68883
- ChemSpider: 62115
- UNII: CBI6614BOL
- ChEMBL: ChEMBL148635
- CompTox Dashboard (EPA): DTXSID90988505

Chemical and physical data
- Formula: C_{24}H_{37}ClN_{2}O_{2}
- Molar mass: 421.02 g·mol^{−1}
- 3D model (JSmol): Interactive image
- SMILES: CC(C)(C(=O)N(C)C1CCCCC1)C2(CCN(CC2)CCC3=CC=CC=C3Cl)O
- InChI: InChI=1S/C24H37ClN2O2/c1-23(2,22(28)26(3)20-10-5-4-6-11-20)24(29)14-17-27(18-15-24)16-13-19-9-7-8-12-21(19)25/h7-9,12,20,29H,4-6,10-11,13-18H2,1-3H3; Key:CNIMNQJXZKALLC-UHFFFAOYSA-N

Pipradimadol (FU 29-245) is an analgesic, antiserotoninergic agent and potentially an antidepressant. The pharmacology is said to be mediated through the opiate receptor. The potency is on the same order of magnitude as for morphine.

== See also ==
- Pipramadol
