= Myelomonocyte =

A myelomonocyte is a type of cell observed in chronic myelomonocytic leukemia. It bears a resemblance to both a myelocyte and monocyte. It is derived from CFU-GM.
