= Interleukin 3 =

Protein-coding gene in the species Homo sapiens

IL3

Identifiers
- Aliases: IL3, interleukin 3, IL-3, MCGF, MULTI-CSF
- External IDs: OMIM: 147740; GeneCards: IL3
Available structures
PDB	Human UniProt search: PDBe RCSB
PDB	List of PDB id codes 1JLI

Gene location (Human)
Chr.	Chromosome 5 (human)
Band	5q31.1	Start	132,060,655 bp
Band	5q31.1	End	132,063,204 bp
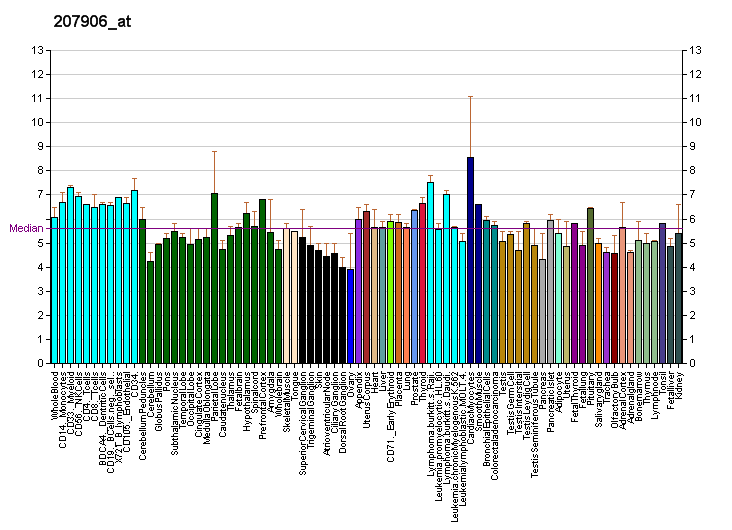
RNA expression pattern
Bgee	Human / Mouse (ortholog); Top expressed in: Achilles tendon; bone marrow; lymph node; appendix / n/a; More reference expression data
BioGPS	More reference expression data
Gene ontology
Molecular function	growth factor activity; interleukin-3 receptor binding; cytokine activity; protein tyrosine kinase activity; interleukin-1 receptor binding
Cellular component	extracellular region; intracellular anatomical structure; extracellular space
Biological process	MAPK cascade; embryonic hemopoiesis; cell-cell signaling; nervous system development; positive regulation of peptidyl-tyrosine phosphorylation; immune response; peptidyl-tyrosine phosphorylation; positive regulation of tyrosine phosphorylation of STAT protein; fever generation; regulation of cytokine-mediated signaling pathway; regulation of signaling receptor activity; cytokine-mediated signaling pathway; positive regulation of cell population proliferation
Sources:Amigo / QuickGO
Orthologs
Databases	NCBI: entry; OMA: entry
Species	Human	Mouse
Entrez	3562	n/a
Ensembl	ENSG00000164399	n/a
UniProt	P08700	n/a
RefSeq (mRNA)	NM_000588	n/a
RefSeq (protein)	NP_000579	n/a
Location (UCSC)	Chr 5: 132.06 – 132.06 Mb	n/a
PubMed search		n/a
- Wikidata
View/Edit Human

Interleukin 3 (IL-3) is a protein that in humans is encoded by the IL3 gene localized on chromosome 5q31.1. Sometimes also called colony-stimulating factor, multi-CSF, mast cell growth factor, MULTI-CSF, MCGF; MGC79398, MGC79399: after removal of the signal peptide sequence, the mature protein contains 133 amino acids in its polypeptide chain. IL-3 is produced as a monomer by activated T cells, monocytes/macrophages and stroma cells. The major function of IL-3 cytokine is to regulate the concentrations of various blood-cell types. It induces proliferation and differentiation in both early pluripotent stem cells and committed progenitors. It also has many more specific effects like the regeneration of platelets and potentially aids in early antibody isotype switching.

== Function ==
Interleukin 3 is an interleukin, a type of biological signal (cytokine) that can improve the body's natural response to disease as part of the immune system. In conjunction with other β common chain cytokines GM-CSF and IL-5, IL-3 works to regulate the inflammatory response in order to clear pathogens by changing the abundance of various cell populations via binding at the interleukin-3 receptor.

IL-3 is mainly produced by activated T cells with the goal of initiating proliferation of various other immune cell types. However, IL-3 has also been shown to be produced in IgG+ B cells and may be involved in earlier antibody isotype switching. IL-3 is capable of stimulating differentiation of immature myelomonocytic cells causing changes to the macrophage and granulocyte populations. IL-3 signaling is able to give rise to widest array of cell lineages which is why it has been independently named "multi-CSF" in some older literature.

IL-3 also induces various effector functions in both immature and mature cells that more precisely modulate the body's defense against microbial pathogens. IL-3 is also involved in the reconstruction of platelets via the development of megakaryocytes.

Interleukin 3 stimulates the differentiation of multipotent hematopoietic stem cells into myeloid progenitor cells or, with the addition of IL-7, into lymphoid progenitor cells. In addition, IL-3 stimulates proliferation of all cells in the myeloid lineage (granulocytes, monocytes, and dendritic cells), in conjunction with other cytokines, e.g., Erythropoietin (EPO), Granulocyte macrophage colony-stimulating factor (GM-CSF), and IL-6.

IL-3 is secreted by basophils and activated T cells to support growth and differentiation of T cells from the bone marrow in an immune response. Activated T cells can either induce their own proliferation and differentiation (autocrine signaling), or that of other T cells (paracrine signaling) – both involve IL-2 binding to the IL-2 receptor on T cells (upregulated upon cell activation, under the induction of macrophage-secreted IL-1). The human IL-3 gene encodes a protein 152 amino acids long, and the naturally occurring IL-3 is glycosylated. The human IL-3 gene is located on chromosome 5, only 9 kilobases from the GM-CSF gene, and its function is quite similar to GM-CSF.

== Receptor ==
IL-3 is a T cell-derived, pluripotent and hematopoietic factor required for survival and proliferation of hematopoietic progenitor cells. The signal transmission is ensured by high affinity between cell surface interleukin-3 receptor and IL-3. This high affinity receptor contains α and β subunits. IL-3 shares the β subunit with IL-5 and granulocyte-macrophage colony-stimulating factor (GM-CSF). This β subunit sharing explains the biological functional similarities of different hematopoietic growth factors.

IL-3 receptors can be found on a variety of cell types including many immature myelomonocytic cells in the hemopoietic system such as hemopoietic progenitor cells, as well as certain myeloid progenitors, basophils, and eosinophils.

IL-3/Receptor complex induces JAK2/STAT5 cell signalization pathway. It can stimulate transcription factor c‑myc (activation of gene expression) and Ras pathway (suppression of apoptosis).

== Discovery ==
In the early 1960s Ginsberg and Sachs discovered that IL-3 is a potent mast cell growth factor produced from activated T cells. Interleukin 3 was originally discovered in mice and later isolated from humans. The cytokine was originally discovered via the observation that it induced the synthesis of 20alpha-hydroxysteroid dehydrogenase in hematopoietic cells and termed it interleukin-3 (IL-3).

== Disease ==
IL-3 is produced by T cells only after stimulation with antigens or other specific impulses.

However, it was observed that IL-3 is present in the myelomonocytic leukaemia cell line WEHI-3B. It is thought that this genetic change is the key in development of this leukemia type.

== Immunological therapy ==
Human IL-3 was first cloned in 1986 and since then clinical trials are ongoing. Post-chemotherapy, IL-3 application reduces chemotherapy delays and promotes regeneration of granulocytes and platelets. However, only IL-3 treatment in bone marrow failure disorders such as myelodysplastic syndrome (MDS) and aplastic anemia (AA) was disappointing.

It has been shown that combination of IL-3, GM-CSF and stem cell factor enhances peripheral blood stem cells during high-dose chemotherapy.

Other studies showed that IL-3 could be a future perspective therapeutic agent in lymphohematopoietic disorders and solid cancers.

== Interactions ==
Interleukin 3 has been shown to interact with IL3RA.

== See also ==
- Interleukin
