= CPM-LAD =

Clinical data
- Other names: CPMLAD; CYPM-LAD; CYPMLAD; 6-(Cyclopropylmethyl)-6-nor-LSD; N(6)-Cyclopropylmethyl-norLSD;
- Drug class: Serotonin receptor modulator; Serotonergic psychedelic; Hallucinogen
- ATC code: None

Identifiers
- IUPAC name: (6aR,9R)-7-(cyclopropylmethyl)-N,N-diethyl-6,6a,8,9-tetrahydro-4H-indolo[4,3-fg]quinoline-9-carboxamide
- PubChem CID: 166091837

Chemical and physical data
- Formula: C_{23}H_{29}N_{3}O
- Molar mass: 363.505 g·mol^{−1}
- 3D model (JSmol): Interactive image
- SMILES: CCN(CC)C(=O)[C@H]1CN([C@@H]2CC3=CNC4=CC=CC(=C34)C2=C1)CC5CC5
- InChI: InChI=1S/C23H29N3O/c1-3-25(4-2)23(27)17-10-19-18-6-5-7-20-22(18)16(12-24-20)11-21(19)26(14-17)13-15-8-9-15/h5-7,10,12,15,17,21,24H,3-4,8-9,11,13-14H2,1-2H3/t17-,21-/m1/s1; Key:XTKDRKBVDJFYNW-DYESRHJHSA-N

CPM-LAD, or CYPM-LAD, also known as 6-(cyclopropylmethyl)-6-nor-LSD, is a serotonin receptor modulator and putative psychedelic drug of the lysergamide family. It is the analogue of LSD in which the methyl group at the 6 position has been replaced with a cyclopropylmethyl group.

== Use and effects ==
Unlike related lysergamides, CPM-LAD was not mentioned in Alexander Shulgin's 1997 book TiHKAL (Tryptamines I Have Known and Loved) and is not known to have been tested in humans.

== Pharmacology ==
=== Pharmacodynamics ===
CPM-LAD showed affinity (K_{i}) values for serotonin receptors of 10.9 nM for serotonin-labeled 5-HT_{1} receptors and 7.7 nM for ketanserin-labeled 5-HT_{2} receptors. These affinities were very similar to but slightly lower than those of LSD. CPM-LAD fully substituted for LSD in rodent drug discrimination tests with an ED_{50} of 0.067 μmol/kg, relative to a dose of 0.046 μmol/kg in the case of LSD (with CPM-LAD about 1.5-fold less potent than LSD). Additional pharmacology for CPM-LAD has also been published.

== History ==
CPM-LAD was first described in the scientific literature by Andrew Joseph Hoffman of the lab of David E. Nichols at Purdue University in 1987. Subsequently, it was patented by Gilgamesh Pharmaceuticals in 2022, who further studied and described its pharmacology. Derivatives of CPM-LAD have also been patented by Daniel Trachsel and Matthias Liechti and colleagues in association with MindMed.

== Society and culture ==
=== Legal status ===
==== Canada ====
CPM-LAD is not a controlled substance in Canada as of 2025.

== See also ==
- Substituted lysergamide
- CYP-LAD
