= Plasmacytoid dendritic cell =

Type of immune cell in the blood

Plasmacytoid dendritic cells (pDCs) are a rare type of immune cell that are known to secrete large quantities of type 1 interferon (IFNs) in response to a viral infection. They circulate in the blood and are found in peripheral lymphoid organs. They develop from bone marrow hematopoietic stem cells and constitute < 0.4% of peripheral blood mononuclear cells (PBMC). Other than conducting antiviral mechanisms, pDCs are considered to be key in linking the innate and adaptive immune systems. However, pDCs are also responsible for participating in and exacerbating certain autoimmune diseases like lupus. pDCs that undergo malignant transformation cause a rare hematologic disorder, blastic plasmacytoid dendritic cell neoplasm.

== Development and characteristics ==
In the bone marrow, common dendritic cell progenitors expressing Flt3 (CD135) receptors are able to give rise to pDCs. Flt3 or CD135 signaling induces differentiation and proliferation of pDCs, although their mechanisms are not entirely understood. Phosphoinositide 3-kinase (PI3K)-dependent activation of mechanistic target of rapamycin (mTOR) is believed to regulate this signaling pathway. Transcription factor E2-2 has also been found to play a key role in influencing the lineage commitment of a common DC progenitor on its course to becoming a pDC.

Unlike conventional dendritic cells (cDCs) that leave the bone marrow as precursors, pDCs leave the bone marrow to go to the lymphoid organs and peripheral blood upon completing development. Plasmacytoid dendritic cells are also distinguished from cDCs because of their ability to produce significant amounts of type-1 interferon. pDC maturation is initiated when the cell comes in contact with a virus, prompting the upregulation of MHC class I and MHC class II, co-stimulatory molecules CD80, CD86, CD83, and c-c chemokine receptor 7 (CCR7) and interferon production gradually decreases. CCR7 expression prompts the matured pDC to migrate to a lymph node where it will be able to stimulate and interact with T cells.

In humans, pDCs exhibit plasma cell morphology and express CD4, HLA-DR, CD123, blood-derived dendritic cell antigen-2 (BDCA-2), Toll-like receptor (TLR) 7 and TLR9 within endosomal compartments. Expression of TLR 7 and TLR 9 allows pDCs to interact with viral and host nucleic acids. TLR 7 and TLR 9 detect ssRNA and unmethylated CpG DNA sequences, respectively. ILT7 and BDCA-4 are also expressed on human pDC surfaces, although their signaling pathways are still obscure. However, there are speculations that the interaction between ILT7 and BST2 may have a negative regulatory effect on the cell's interferon production. Unlike myeloid dendritic cells, myeloid antigens like CD11b, CD11c, CD13, CD14 and CD33 are not present on pDC surfaces. Furthermore, pDCs express markers CD123, CD303 (BDCA-2) and CD304 unlike other dendritic cell types.

== Blastic plasmacytoid dendritic cell neoplasm ==
Blastic plasmacytoid dendritic cell neoplasm (BPDCN) is a rare type of myeloid cancer in which malignant pDCs infiltrate the skin, bone marrow, central nervous system, and other tissues. Typically, the disease presents with skin lesions (e.g. nodules, tumors, papules, bruise-like patches, and/or ulcers) that most often occur on the head, face, and upper torso. This presentation may be accompanied by cPC infiltrations into other tissues to result in swollen lymph nodes, enlarged liver, enlarged spleen, symptoms of central nervous system dysfunction, and similar abnormalities in breasts, eyes, kidneys, lungs, gastrointestinal tract, bone, sinuses, ears, and/or testes. The disease may also present as a pDC leukemia, i.e. increased levels of malignant pDC in blood (i.e. >2% of nucleated cells) and bone marrow and evidence (i.e. cytopenias) of bone marrow failure. Blastic plasmacytoid dendritic cell neoplasm has a high rate of recurrence following initial treatments with various chemotherapy regimens. In consequence, the disease has a poor overall prognosis and newer chemotherapeutic and novel non-chemotherapeutic drug regimens to improve the situation are under study.

== Role in immunity ==
Upon stimulation and subsequent activation of TLR7 and TLR9, these cells produce large amounts (up to 1,000 times more than other cell type) of type I interferon (mainly IFN-α and IFN-β), which are critical anti-viral compounds mediating a wide range of effects and induce maturation of the pDC. For example, the secretion of type 1 interferon triggers natural killer cells to produce IFNγ while also activating the differentiation of B cells. In addition, they can produce cytokines IL-12, IL-6 and TNF-α as well, helping to recruit other immune cells to the site of infection.

Because they are capable of activating other immune cells, pDCs serve as a bridge between innate and adaptive immunity. A pDC's ability to stimulate T cells is heightened following maturation. As mentioned earlier, maturation also induces the expression of both MHC Class I and Class II molecules in pDCs as well, which allows the cell to optimize its antigen-presenting abilities. MHC class I on pDC surfaces are able to activate CD8^{+} T cells, while MHC class II have been found to activate CD4^{+} T cells. pDCs are also thought to be able to promote both T cell activation and tolerance.

== Role in autoimmunity and diseases ==
=== Psoriasis ===
Patients who suffer from psoriasis typically exhibit skin lesions where pDCs accumulate. Inhibiting pDCs from secreting IFN diminished the appearance of the skin lesions. When DNA is released via apoptosis of an infected host cell, antibodies are produced against the host's own DNA. (see autoantibody). These anti-host DNA antibodies are able to stimulate pDCs which proceed to secrete IFN, furthering the activity of adaptive immunity.

=== Lupus ===
Although the pDC's ability to mass produce type 1 interferon can be effective in targeting a viral infection, it can also lead to Systemic lupus erythematosus if not regulated properly. Type 1 interferon production is strongly correlated with the progression of lupus, and is thought to drive excessive maturation of pDCs and activation of B cells, among many other effects. In patients with lupus, pDC levels in the circulating blood are decreased most of the pDCs have migrated toward the inflamed and affected tissues.

=== HIV ===
The mass production of type 1 interferon may result in both positive and negative outcomes in response to HIV. Although type 1 interferon is efficient at facilitating maturation in pDCs and in killing infected T cells, excessive clearance of infected T cells may have detrimental effects and further weaken the patient's compromised immune system. pDCs themselves can be infected by HIV but are also capable of sensing viral markers such as ssRNA and are impaired in their interferon-producing capacities. However, it seems that in HIV, pDCs not only lose their interferon secreting properties but also die, expediting the progression of the disease. Decreases in functional, live of uninfected pDCs have resulted in decreases in CD4^{+} T cells that further compromise the patient's immune defenses against HIV. Thus, maintaining balance and regulation of pDC activity is crucial for a more positive prognosis in HIV patients.

=== COVID-19 ===
Reduced numbers of pDCs with age is associated with increased COVID-19 severity, possibly because these cells are substantial interferon producers.
