= Pirinixic acid =

Chemical compound

Identifiers
- IUPAC name: 2-({4-chloro-6-[(2,3-dimethylphenyl)amino]pyrimidin-2-yl}sulfanyl)acetic acid
- CAS Number: 50892-23-4
- PubChem CID: 5694
- IUPHAR/BPS: 2666
- ChemSpider: 5492
- UNII: 86C4MRT55A
- ChEMBL: ChEMBL295416
- CompTox Dashboard (EPA): DTXSID4020290
- ECHA InfoCard: 100.150.489

Chemical and physical data
- Formula: C_{14}H_{14}ClN_{3}O_{2}S
- Molar mass: 323.80 g·mol^{−1}
- 3D model (JSmol): Interactive image
- SMILES: Cc1cccc(c1C)Nc2cc(nc(n2)SCC(=O)O)Cl
- InChI: InChI=1S/C14H14ClN3O2S/c1-8-4-3-5-10(9(8)2)16-12-6-11(15)17-14(18-12)21-7-13(19)20/h3-6H,7H2,1-2H3,(H,19,20)(H,16,17,18); Key:SZRPDCCEHVWOJX-UHFFFAOYSA-N

Pirinixic acid is a peroxisome proliferator-activated receptor alpha (PPARα) agonist that is under experimental investigation for prevention of severe cardiac dysfunction, cardiomyopathy and heart failure as a result of lipid accumulation within cardiac myocytes. Treatment is primarily aimed at individuals with an adipose triglyceride lipase (ATGL) enzyme deficiency or mutation because of the essential PPAR protein interactions with free fatty acid monomers derived from the ATGL catalyzed lipid oxidation reaction. It was discovered as WY-14,643 in 1974.

== Adipose triglyceride lipase (ATGL) ==
Adipose triglyceride lipase (ATGL), an enzyme that catalyzes the rate limiting hydrolysis step of triglycerides in the triacylglycerol lipolysis cascade, is expressed predominantly in adipose tissue, but is also found in lesser amounts within cardiac and skeletal muscle. Its function is to initiate the breakdown of intracellular triglycerides into fatty acid monomers. Individuals deficient in the ATGL enzyme are at higher risk for cardiac dysfunction and premature death because of increased size and accumulation of lipid droplets within cardiac myocytes.

== Peroxisome proliferator activated receptors (PPARs) ==
PPARs are a family of ligand activated receptors which include PPARα, PPARδ and PPARγ subtypes that are expressed in varying amounts in nuclear membranes of in different tissues. PPAR activation occurs with free fatty acid binding, or fatty acid derivative ligands that have been broken down via the triacylglycerol lipolysis cascade. Activated PPARs act as transcription factors to increase expression of specific genes within cells. PPARα, a PPAR subtype, controls the expression of genes involved in cardiac fatty acid utilization, and its activation, stimulates free fatty acid oxidation by increasing mitochondrial free fatty acid uptake and oxidation via two enzymes: carnitine palmitoyltransferase I (M-CPT I) and medium-chain acyl-CoA dehydrogenase (MCAD).

== Pre-clinical trials ==
ATGL deficient mice administered pirinixic acid demonstrated reduced cardiac hypertrophy and improved cardiac function. These data demonstrate that genes induced by PPARα activation via free fatty acids from ATGL-dependent reactions are essential for the maintenance of normal cardiac function. As PPARα activation triggers the expression of genes involved in lipid metabolism (M-CPTI I and MCAD), treating the mice with pirinixic acid may improve cardiac myocyte energy supply by increasing mitochondrial fatty acid β-oxidation to prevent severe cardiac dysfunction as a result of lipid accumulation .
