= Pirolazamide =

Chemical compound

Clinical data
- ATC code: none

Identifiers
- IUPAC name: 4-(hexahydropyrrolo[1,2-a]pyrazin-2(1H)-yl)-2,2-diphenylbutanamide
- CAS Number: 39186-49-7
- PubChem CID: 71442
- ChemSpider: 64526
- UNII: GQN5BVM24W
- KEGG: D05509
- CompTox Dashboard (EPA): DTXSID70865946

Chemical and physical data
- Formula: C_{23}H_{29}N_{3}O
- Molar mass: 363.505 g·mol^{−1}
- 3D model (JSmol): Interactive image
- SMILES: O=C(N)C(c1ccccc1)(c2ccccc2)CCN4CC3N(CCC3)CC4
- InChI: InChI=1S/C23H29N3O/c24-22(27)23(19-8-3-1-4-9-19,20-10-5-2-6-11-20)13-15-25-16-17-26-14-7-12-21(26)18-25/h1-6,8-11,21H,7,12-18H2,(H2,24,27); Key:SEINJQWGYXAADT-UHFFFAOYSA-N

Pirolazamide (SC-26,438) is an antiarrhythmic agent that was never marked.
