= CLEC4C =

Protein-coding gene in humans

Identifiers
- Aliases: CLEC4C, BDCA2, CD303, CLECSF11, CLECSF7, DLEC, HECL, PRO34150, C-type lectin domain family 4 member C, BDCA-2
- External IDs: OMIM: 606677; MGI: 1917060; GeneCards: CLEC4C
Available structures
PDB	Human UniProt search: PDBe RCSB
PDB	List of PDB id codes 3WBP, 3WBQ, 3WBR, 4ZES, 4ZET

Gene location (Human)
Chr.	Chromosome 12 (human)
Band	12p13.31	Start	7,729,383 bp
Band	12p13.31	End	7,751,605 bp

Gene location (Mouse)
Chr.	Chromosome 6 (mouse)
Band	6|6 F2	Start	123,026,921 bp
Band	6|6 F2	End	123,048,514 bp
RNA expression pattern
Bgee	Human / Mouse (ortholog); Top expressed in: secondary oocyte; testicle; buccal mucosa cell; white blood cell; monocyte; granulocyte; gonad; blood; bone marrow cell; appendix / Top expressed in: spermatid; right kidney; granulocyte; white adipose tissue; spleen; lip; subcutaneous adipose tissue; intercostal muscle; cervix; skin of abdomen; More reference expression data
BioGPS	n/a
Gene ontology
Molecular function	carbohydrate binding; metal ion binding
Cellular component	integral component of membrane; membrane; secretory granule membrane; tertiary granule membrane; ficolin-1-rich granule membrane; plasma membrane
Biological process	stimulatory C-type lectin receptor signaling pathway; adaptive immune response; immune system process; innate immune response; neutrophil degranulation
Sources:Amigo / QuickGO
Orthologs
Databases	NCBI: entry; OMA: entry
Species	Human	Mouse
Entrez	170482	69810
Ensembl	ENSG00000198178	ENSMUSG00000030147
UniProt	Q8WTT0	n/a
RefSeq (mRNA)	NM_203503; NM_130441; NM_001371390; NM_001371391	NM_001190310; NM_027218
RefSeq (protein)	NP_569708; NP_987099; NP_001358319; NP_001358320	n/a
Location (UCSC)	Chr 12: 7.73 – 7.75 Mb	Chr 6: 123.03 – 123.05 Mb
PubMed search
- Wikidata
View/Edit Human	View/Edit Mouse

CLEC4C is a membrane protein of plasmacytoid dendritic cells used as a marker for this kind of cells and denoted as CD303 in the nomenclature of the Cluster of differentiation.
