= Propyphenazone/paracetamol/caffeine =

Combination drug

Combination of
- Propyphenazone: Analgesic
- Paracetamol: Analgesic
- Caffeine: Stimulant

Clinical data
- Trade names: Saridon, Caffetin light, Bodrex Migra
- AHFS/Drugs.com: International Drug Names
- Routes of administration: By mouth
- ATC code: N02BB54 (WHO)

Identifiers
- CAS Number: 8064-93-5
- ChemSpider: None

Propyphenazone/paracetamol/caffeine (trade name Saridon) is an analgesic combination indicated for the management of headache. It contains the analgesics propyphenazone and paracetamol and the stimulant caffeine.

Saridon was first launched by Roche in 1933, initially containing pyrithyldione and phenacetin, widely used remedies for fever and pain. It often contained aspirin, phenacetin and caffeine, but was reformulated in 1981, replacing the original ingredient phenacetin with paracetamol, before phenacetin was banned by the US FDA in 1983. It was available in more than 80 countries across Europe, Latin America, Asia and Africa, but has been discontinued in many of them.

== Medical uses ==
This combination is used for the relief of pain such as headache, toothache, menstrual discomfort, pain and fever associated with colds and flu, and for postoperative and rheumatic pain.

=== Efficacy ===
Paracetamol, an analgesic and antipyretic substance, has slow onset but has a longer duration of action and is lacking anti-inflammatory properties. On the other hand, propyphenazone, a non-steroidal anti-inflammatory drug (NSAID), is proven to have a faster onset but shorter duration of action. The combination of paracetamol and propyphenazone increases and prolongs the therapeutic activity of propyphenazone: peak blood plasma concentrations increase by about 40%, and the elimination half-life is prolonged to about 77 minutes. Caffeine, with a stimulating effect, is a drug that wards off drowsiness and restores alertness. It also enhances the analgesic potency of paracetamol, although a Cochrane review concluded that a dose of 100 mg is needed for an effect – double the amount contained in Saridon.

== Adverse effects ==
Adverse effects are uncommon and include skin rashes, pruritus (itching), erythema, angioedema, breathing problems such as dyspnea and asthma, anaphylaxis (serious allergic reactions), and decrease in the number of blood cells such as thrombocytopenia, leucopenia, agranulocytosis, and pancytopenia. The latter type of side effect can be severe.

Based on a 2004 report from Lareb, a Dutch pharmacovigilance center, it was noted that twenty adverse reactions to Saridon had been reported with no mention of fatal to near fatal cases. The report concluded by saying that there was no information available of the incidence of anaphylactic reactions to propyphenazone, and that the summary of product characteristics (SPC) states an incidence of less than 0.01%. The Lareb report suggests the actual incidence to be higher.

== Interactions ==
Known interactions are mostly related to the paracetamol component. Barbiturates, phenytoin, carbamazepine and rifampicin increase the formation of toxic paracetamol metabolites in the liver. Alcohol also increases paracetamol's liver toxicity. The combination of zidovudine with paracetamol can increase the risk of neutropenia. Elimination of chloramphenicol is prolonged five-fold by paracetamol.

== Contraindications ==
Contraindications are hypersensitivity to phenazone, propyphenazone, aminophenazone, metamizol, phenylbutazone, paracetamol, acetylsalicylic acid, or caffeine; bone marrow deficiencies; glucose-6-phosphate dehydrogenase deficiency; acute hepatic porphyria; alcoholism; gastrointestinal ulcers or bleeding; pregnancy and lactation; infants and children under 6 to 12 years (varying by country).

== Society and culture ==
=== Restrictions ===
WHO comment: "Propyphenazone, a pyrazolone derivative with anti-inflammatory, analgesic and antipyretic activity, was introduced in 1951 for the treatment of rheumatic disorders. As it is structurally related to aminophenazone it has been associated with severe blood dyscrasias. However, it cannot be transformed into potentially carcinogenic nitrosamines and has therefore been widely used as a replacement drug for aminophenazone. In certain countries, products containing propyphenazone have now been restricted in their indications, whereas in others they are still available, sometimes as over-the-counter preparations."

- Sri Lanka
- Malaysia
- Thailand
- Turkey: Banned for production and sale in January 1986 because of severe adverse reactions.

Available without prescription as of 2025.

=== India ===
In September 2018, Saridon, along with 327 other FDCs, was banned by the Central Drugs Standard Control Organisation..Later, in the same month, based on extensive safety data submitted by Piramal, the Supreme Court of India stayed the centre's decision and allowed the sale of Saridon.

Saridon was made available by Piramal Enterprises Ltd. Commonly used to get relief from a headache, Saridon was available at ₹ 46.50 (As of 2023) per a strip which contained 10 tablets, marketed by Bayer pharmaceuticals pvt ltd India. The formulation in India consisted of 150 mg of propyphenazone, 250 mg of paracetamol and 50 mg of caffeine. Another medicine Dart commonly available also consists similar combination with 150 mg of propyphenazone, 300 mg of paracetamol and 50 mg of caffeine.

=== Philippines ===
Saridon is available in the Philippines and is being sold at a suggested retail price of PhP4.35 per tablet. Initially available in the Visayas-Mindanao region only, it was rolled out in Luzon in 2011 with the goal of replicating its success in Visayas and Mindanao in a national scope.

Saridon is the only pain medication in the country that has three active ingredients, and the only one listing caffeine as one of its ingredients.

=== Singapore ===
Saridon is not found in the Singapore market anymore (valid 2016, 2019). In an old copy of DIMS, it was listed that it contained propyphenazone 150 mg, ethoxybenzamide 250 mg, pyrithyldione 50 mg, and caffeine 50 mg. Please look for an old reference to verify.

== See also ==
Metamizole
