= Algifen =

Trademark of compositional analgesic drug

Algifen is trademark of compositional analgesic drug based on mixture of metamizole, pitofenone and fenpiverinium. It was produced by Zentiva in tablet-form, it was marketed in Central and Eastern Europe.

Similar drug combinations are now marketed by Teva under the name Algifen Neo (in the form of peroral drops). Composition (per 1 ml): metamizole 500 mg, pitofenone 5 mg. It is frequently used during urinary infection to relieve pain.
