= Iodoantipyrine =

Identifiers
- IUPAC name: 4-iodo-1,5-dimethyl-2-phenylpyrazol-3-one
- CAS Number: 129-81-7
- PubChem CID: 8522
- ChemSpider: 8208
- UNII: V30V6H1QX4
- ChEMBL: ChEMBL24132
- CompTox Dashboard (EPA): DTXSID7046047
- ECHA InfoCard: 100.004.516

Chemical and physical data
- Formula: C_{11}H_{11}IN_{2}O
- Molar mass: 314.126 g·mol^{−1}
- 3D model (JSmol): Interactive image
- SMILES: CC1=C(C(=O)N(N1C)C2=CC=CC=C2)I
- InChI: InChI=1S/C11H11IN2O/c1-8-10(12)11(15)14(13(8)2)9-6-4-3-5-7-9/h3-7H,1-2H3; Key:ZZOBLCHCPLOXCE-UHFFFAOYSA-N

Iodoantipyrine is a drug developed in the 1950s. It has antiinflammatory effects, and also has antiviral action by inducing interferon production. It has been used in Russia for the treatment of tick-borne encephalitis, but is more commonly used in recent times in its radiolabelled form for tracking blood flow.

== See also ==
- Aminophenazone
- Phenazone (Antipyrine)
- Propyphenazone
