= C13H17N3O =

The molecular formula C_{13}H_{17}N_{3}O (molar mass: 231.29 g/mol, exact mass: 231.1372 u) may refer to:

- AL-38022A
- Aminophenazone, or aminopyrine
- PNU-91356A (U-91356)
