= C11H13N3O =

The molecular formula C_{11}H_{13}N_{3}O (molar mass: 203.24 g/mol) may refer to:

- Ampyrone
- 5-Carboxamidotryptamine
- Feprosidnine
- Sumanirole
