= Famprofazone =

NSAID analgesic medication

Clinical data
- Trade names: Gewodin, Gewolen
- Routes of administration: Oral
- Drug class: Nonsteroidal anti-inflammatory agent (NSAID); Analgesic; Antipyretic; Stimulant
- ATC code: None

Legal status
- Legal status: In general: ℞ (Prescription only)

Pharmacokinetic data
- Metabolites: Methamphetamine

Identifiers
- IUPAC name: 1-methyl-5-{[methyl(1-phenylpropan-2-yl)amino]methyl}-2-phenyl-4-(propan-2-yl)-1,2-dihydro-3H-pyrazol-3-one
- CAS Number: 22881-35-2
- PubChem CID: 3326
- ChemSpider: 3209
- UNII: HN0NCX453C
- ChEMBL: ChEMBL1475693
- CompTox Dashboard (EPA): DTXSID3045435
- ECHA InfoCard: 100.041.153

Chemical and physical data
- Formula: C_{24}H_{31}N_{3}O
- Molar mass: 377.532 g·mol^{−1}
- 3D model (JSmol): Interactive image
- SMILES: O=C2\C(=C(/N(N2c1ccccc1)C)CN(C(C)Cc3ccccc3)C)C(C)C
- InChI: InChI=1S/C24H31N3O/c1-18(2)23-22(17-25(4)19(3)16-20-12-8-6-9-13-20)26(5)27(24(23)28)21-14-10-7-11-15-21/h6-15,18-19H,16-17H2,1-5H3; Key:GNUXVOXXWGNPIV-UHFFFAOYSA-N

Famprofazone, sold under the brand names Gewodin and Gewolen, is a nonsteroidal anti-inflammatory agent (NSAID) of the pyrazolone series which is available over-the-counter in some countries such as Taiwan. It has analgesic, anti-inflammatory, and antipyretic effects. Famprofazone has been known to produce methamphetamine as an active metabolite, with 15–20% of an oral dose being converted to it. As a result, famprofazone has occasionally been implicated in causing positives on drug tests for amphetamines.

== See also ==
- Substituted amphetamine
- Difenamizole
- Morazone
