= Nifenazone =

Chemical compound

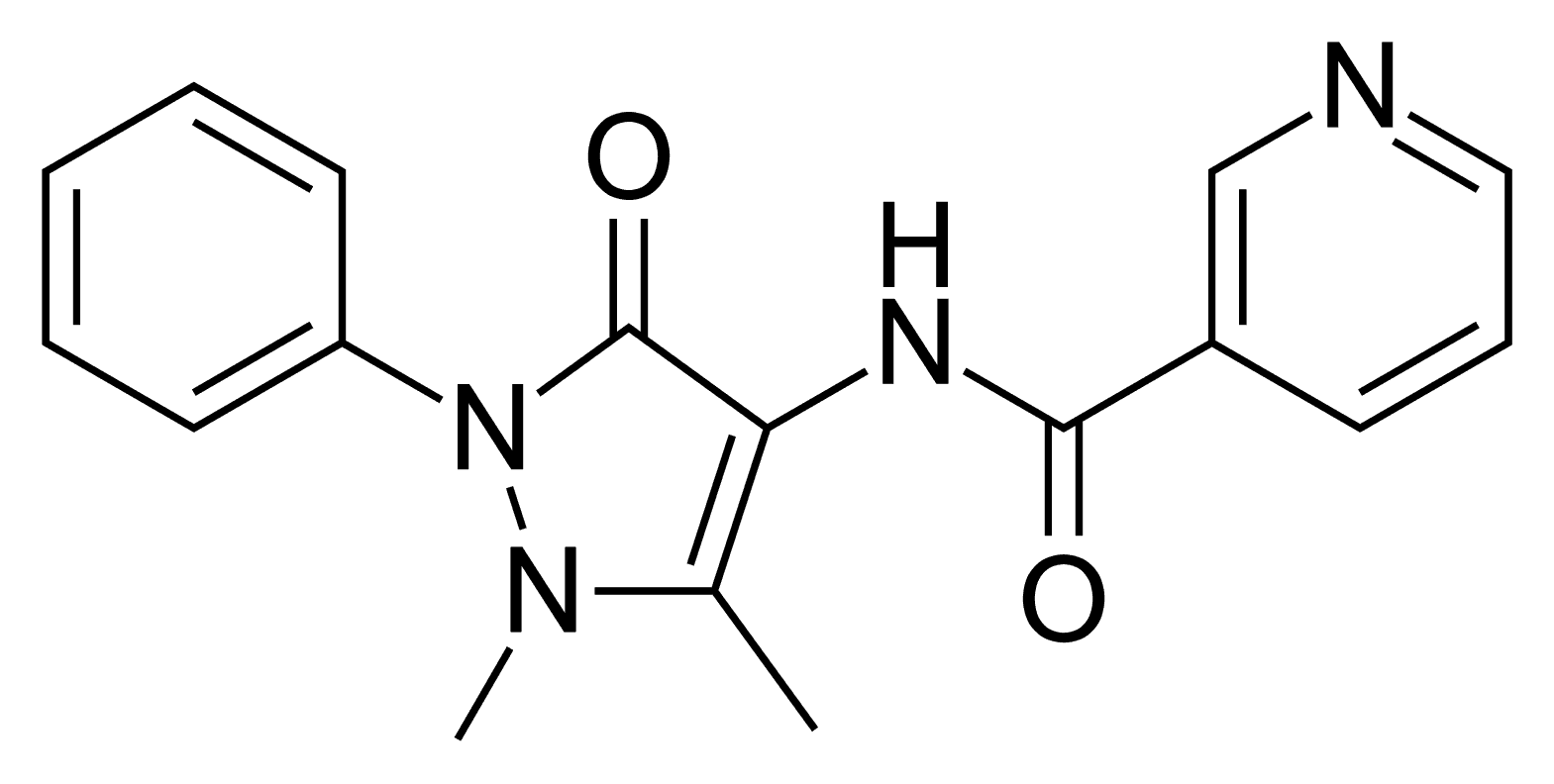

Clinical data
- ATC code: M02AA24 (WHO) N02BB05 (WHO)

Identifiers
- IUPAC name: N-(1,5-dimethyl-3-oxo-2-phenyl-2,3-dihydro-1H-pyrazol-4-yl)nicotinamide
- CAS Number: 2139-47-1
- PubChem CID: 4487
- ChemSpider: 4332
- UNII: 8780F0K71U
- KEGG: D01437
- ChEMBL: ChEMBL1413176
- CompTox Dashboard (EPA): DTXSID7045366
- ECHA InfoCard: 100.016.716

Chemical and physical data
- Formula: C_{17}H_{16}N_{4}O_{2}
- Molar mass: 308.341 g·mol^{−1}
- 3D model (JSmol): Interactive image
- SMILES: c1ccccc1N2N(C)C(C)=C(C2=O)NC(=O)c3cccnc3
- InChI: InChI=1S/C17H16N4O2/c1-12-15(19-16(22)13-7-6-10-18-11-13)17(23)21(20(12)2)14-8-4-3-5-9-14/h3-11H,1-2H3,(H,19,22); Key:BRZANEXCSZCZCI-UHFFFAOYSA-N

Nifenazone is a drug that has been used as an analgesic for a number of rheumatic conditions.

== Synthesis ==

Nifenazone is the amide formed when ampyrone and the acid chloride of nicotinic acid are combined in a Schotten–Baumann reaction.

== See also ==
- Aminopyrine
