= Difenamizole =

Names
- IUPAC name 2-(Dimethylamino)-N-(2,5-diphenylpyrazol-3-yl)propanamide
- Other names Diphenamizole

Identifiers
CAS Number	20170-20-1
3D model (JSmol)	Interactive image
ChEMBL	ChEMBL2105587
ChemSpider	59123
PubChem CID	65695
UNII	24MR6YLL3W
CompTox Dashboard (EPA)	DTXSID60864923
- InChI: InChI=1S/C20H22N4O/c1-15(23(2)3)20(25)21-19-14-18(16-10-6-4-7-11-16)22-24(19)17-12-8-5-9-13-17/h4-15H,1-3H3,(H,21,25) Key: PCXMKBOWWVXEDT-UHFFFAOYSA-N
- SMILES: CC(C(=O)NC1=CC(=NN1C2=CC=CC=C2)C3=CC=CC=C3)N(C)C

Properties
Chemical formula	C_{20}H_{22}N_{4}O
Molar mass	334.423 g·mol^{−1}
- Except where otherwise noted, data are given for materials in their standard state (at 25 °C [77 °F], 100 kPa). Infobox references

Difenamizole (INN; brand name Pasalin; former developmental code name AP-14) is a nonsteroidal anti-inflammatory drug (NSAID) and analgesic of the pyrazolone group related to metamizole. It has monoaminergic properties, including inhibition of monoamine oxidase, augmentation of pargyline-induced elevation of striatal dopamine levels, inhibition of K^{+}-induced striatal dopamine release, and inhibition of the reuptake of dopamine.

== See also ==
- Famprofazone
- Morazone
