= Propyphenazone =

Chemical compound

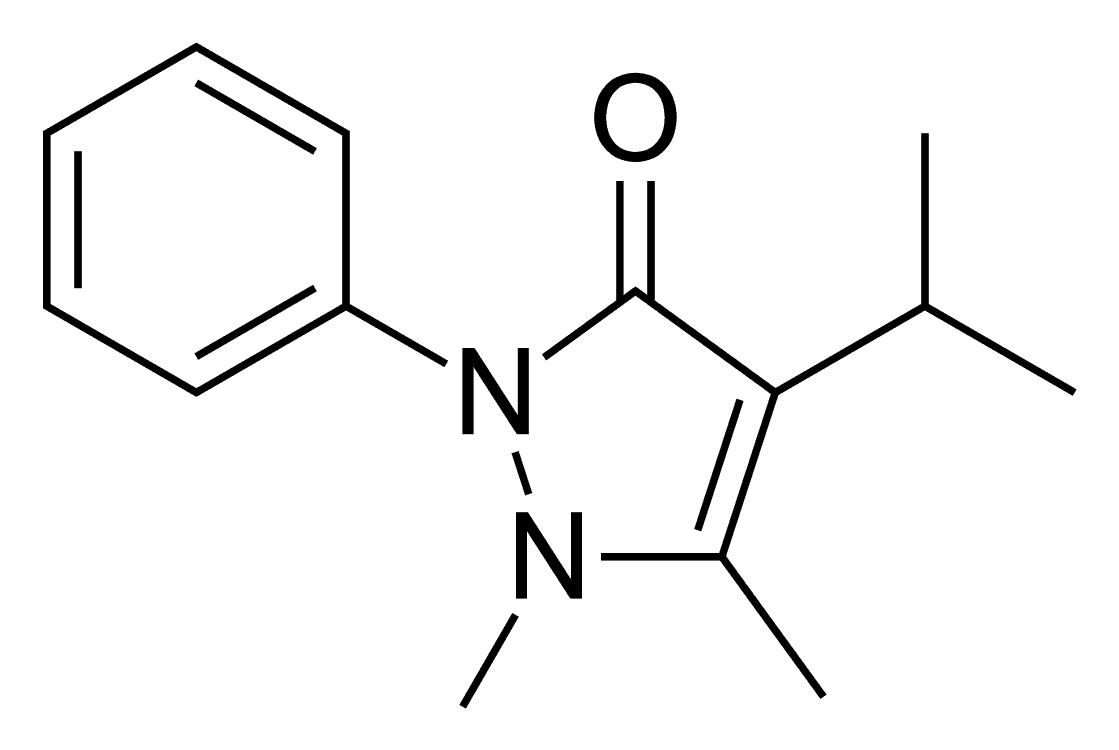

Clinical data
- AHFS/Drugs.com: International Drug Names
- Routes of administration: Oral
- ATC code: N02BB04 (WHO)

Identifiers
- IUPAC name: 1,5-Dimethyl-2-phenyl-4-propan-2-yl-pyrazol-3-one
- CAS Number: 479-92-5
- PubChem CID: 3778
- ChemSpider: 3646
- UNII: OED8FV75PY
- ChEBI: CHEBI:135538
- ChEMBL: ChEMBL28318
- CompTox Dashboard (EPA): DTXSID6023529
- ECHA InfoCard: 100.006.855

Chemical and physical data
- Formula: C_{14}H_{18}N_{2}O
- Molar mass: 230.311 g·mol^{−1}
- 3D model (JSmol): Interactive image
- SMILES: O=C1C(C(C)C)=C(C)N(C)N1c2ccccc2
- InChI: InChI=1S/C14H18N2O/c1-10(2)13-11(3)15(4)16(14(13)17)12-8-6-5-7-9-12/h5-10H,1-4H3; Key:PXWLVJLKJGVOKE-UHFFFAOYSA-N

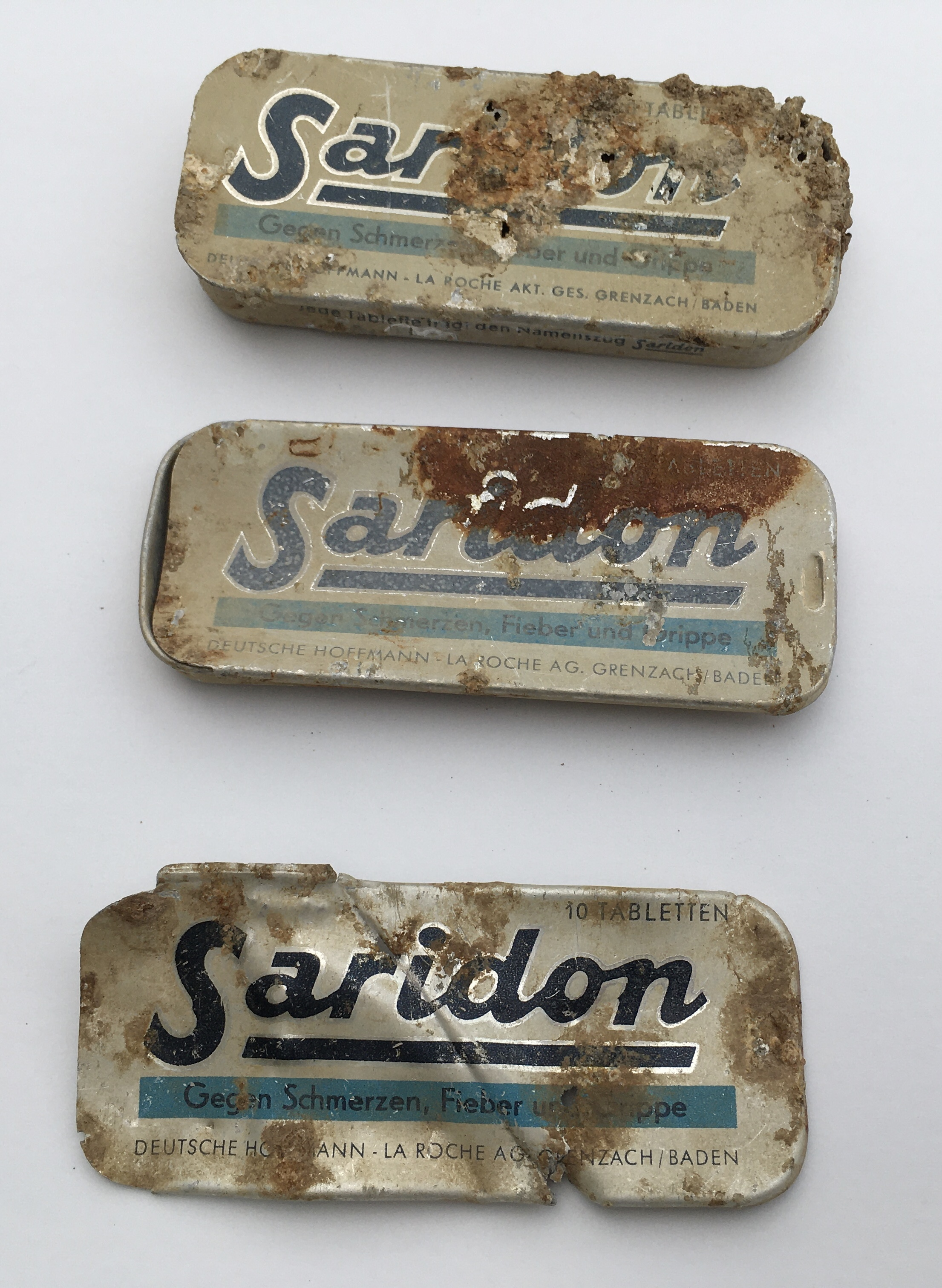
Saridon (Combination drug with Propyphenazone) from Hoffman-La Roche, ca. 1950/60

Propyphenazone (known as isopropylantipyrine in Japan) is a derivative of phenazone with similar analgesic and antipyretic effects. Originally patented in 1931, propyphenazone is marketed as a combination formulation with paracetamol and caffeine for treatment of primary headache disorder.

== Serious adverse events ==
Case reports have described acute inferior-wall myocardial infarctions characterized by low atrial rhythms (Kounis syndrome) secondary to propyphenazone use.

== Excerpt from WHO comments ==
Propyphenazone, a pyrazolone derivative with anti-inflammatory, analgesic and antipyretic activity, was introduced in 1951 for the treatment of rheumatic disorders. As it is structurally related to aminophenazone it has been associated with severe blood dyscrasias. However, it cannot be transformed into potentially carcinogenic nitrosamines and has therefore been widely used as a replacement drug for aminophenazone. In certain countries, products containing propyphenazone have now been restricted in their indications, whereas in others they are still available, sometimes as over-the-counter preparations.

== Banned ==
Propyphenazone is banned in some countries including Sri Lanka, Malaysia, and Thailand.

== Synthesis ==

Ethyl 2-isopropylacetoacetate (1) and phenylhydrazine (2) are combined to form the pyrazolone ring in the intermediate (3), which is alkylated with methyl iodide to yield propyphenazone.

== See also ==
- Propyphenazone/paracetamol/caffeine
- Metamizole
