= Trinder =

Trinder is a surname. Notable people with the surname include:

- Aaron Trinder (born 1980), Australian rugby league player
- Henry Trinder (born 1989), English rugby union player
- Oliver Trinder (1907–1981), British Olympic fencer
- Tommy Trinder CBE (1909–1989), English stage, screen and radio comedian of the pre and post war years

== See also ==
- Trinder glucose activity test, diagnostic test used in medicine to determine the presence of glucose or glucose oxidase
- Trinder Park railway station, railway station on the Beenleigh Line of Brisbane, Australia
- Trinder spot test, diagnostic test used in medicine to determine exposure to salicylates, particularly to salicylic acid
