= C20H22N4O =

The molecular formula C_{20}H_{22}N_{4}O (molar mass: 334.41 g/mol, exact mass: 334.1794 u) may refer to:

- Difenamizole (AP-14)
- PD-168,077
