= Piperylone =

Chemical compound

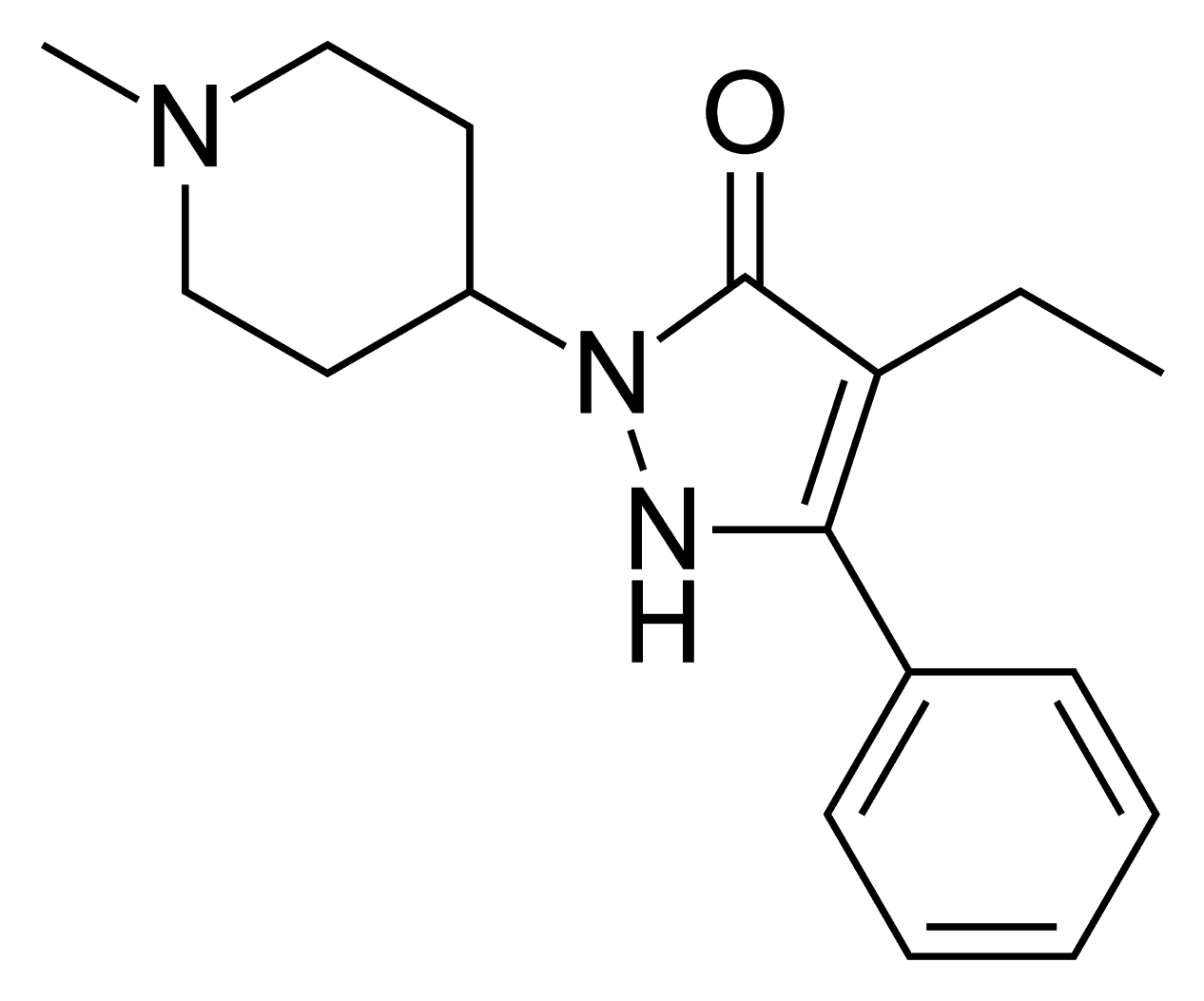

Identifiers
- IUPAC name: 4-ethyl-2-(1-methylpiperidin-4-yl)-5-phenyl-1H-pyrazol-3-one
- CAS Number: 2531-04-6
- PubChem CID: 17319
- ChemSpider: 16389
- UNII: XWH5VH1L2F
- CompTox Dashboard (EPA): DTXSID90179956
- ECHA InfoCard: 100.017.990

Chemical and physical data
- Formula: C_{17}H_{23}N_{3}O
- Molar mass: 285.391 g·mol^{−1}
- 3D model (JSmol): Interactive image
- SMILES: CCC1=C(NN(C1=O)C2CCN(CC2)C)C3=CC=CC=C3
- InChI: InChI=1S/C17H23N3O/c1-3-15-16(13-7-5-4-6-8-13)18-20(17(15)21)14-9-11-19(2)12-10-14/h4-8,14,18H,3,9-12H2,1-2H3; Key:LBFGQUCAQWAFNN-UHFFFAOYSA-N

Piperylone is a pyrazolone with analgesic, anti-inflammatory, and antipyretic properties.

== Synthesis ==
Hydrazone formation of 1-methyl-4-piperidone (1) with benzohydrazide (2) gives (3). Catalytic hydrogenation using Adams' catalyst gives the substituted hydrazine (6) after acid-catalyzed hydrolysis to remove the benzoyl group and neutralization. The pyrazolone ring is formed in a condensation reaction with ethyl 2-benzoylbutanoate (7), yielding piperylone.
