= Kounis syndrome =

- Other names: Allergic acute coronary syndrome
- Specialty: Cardiology

Kounis syndrome is defined as acute coronary syndrome (symptoms such as chest pain relating to reduced blood flow to the heart) caused by an allergic reaction or a strong immune reaction to a drug or other substance. It is a rare syndrome with authentic cases reported in 130 males and 45 females, as reviewed in 2017; however, the disorder is suspected of being commonly overlooked and therefore much more prevalent. Mast cell activation and release of inflammatory cytokines as well as other inflammatory agents from the reaction leads to spasm of the arteries leading to the heart muscle or a plaque breaking free and blocking one or more of those arteries.

The Kounis syndrome is distinguished from two other causes of coronary artery spasms and symptoms viz., the far more common, non-allergic syndrome, Prinzmetal's angina and eosinophilic coronary periarteritis, an extremely rare disorder caused by extensive eosinophilic infiltration of the adventitia and periadventitia, i.e. the soft tissues, surrounding the coronary arteries.

== Epidemiology ==
Through various case observations, Kounis syndrome was noted in many different races and geographical areas. However, most cases have been found in southern Europe including Turkey, Greece, Italy, and Spain. A wide age range is observed from pediatric patients to the elderly including the ages from 2 to 90. Commonly seen comorbidities include hyperlipidemia, diabetes, smoking, hypertension, and prior allergic reactions to a precipitating factor. The exact prevalence is difficult to determine given that this diagnosis is missed or under-diagnosed. There is a possibility for gene-environment interactions as a study reported all patients admitted following emergency department evaluation had a heterozygous E148Q mutation.

== Etiology ==
Many causes have been discovered to precipitate this syndrome including drugs, various health conditions, food, and environmental exposures. Any of these precipitating factors that cause IgE antibody production can contribute to this syndrome. Drugs that have been found previously include analgesics such as aspirin and dipyrone (the so-called "Mexican aspirin"), anesthetics, multiple antibiotics, anticoagulants such as heparin and lepirudin, thrombolytics such as TPA, anti-platelet therapy including clopidogrel, antineoplastics, glucocorticoids, nonsteroidal anti-inflammatory drugs, proton pump inhibitors, and skin disinfectants. Additionally, sympathomimetics, volume expanders, antifungals, antivirals, and oral contraceptives can also trigger this syndrome. Other specific common medications include allopurinol, enalapril, losartan, insulin, and many more. Conditions that incriminate Kounis syndrome include bronchial asthma, eosinophilic granulomatosis with polyangiitis, serum sickness, scombroid syndrome, angioedema, hay fever, anaphylaxis (exercise induced or idiopathic), and anisakiasis. Coronary stenting, a common procedure used in coronary artery disease patients has also been found to be a cause. Environmental exposure to poison ivy, grass, latex, and nicotine are contributory. Bites from creatures that can precipitate Kounis syndrome include spiders, snakes, scorpions, fire ants, and jellyfish. Miscellaneous triggers include contrast media. Reactions to various foods that cause an allergic and inflammatory response can lead to acute coronary syndrome.

== Signs and symptoms ==
Allergic ACS is a syndrome involving two components. One component is immune-mediated resulting in hypersensitivity, allergy, and an anaphylactic or anaphylactoid reaction. The second component involves cardiac signs and symptoms seen with acute coronary syndrome (ACS). Cardiac symptoms vary depending on the type of variant the patient presents with. Acute coronary syndrome is usually associated with a constrictive pain in the chest, characteristically with radiation to the neck or the left arm and often associated with pallor, sweatiness, nausea, and breathlessness. Cardiac signs on exam also include cold extremities, bradycardia, tachycardia, hypotension, possible cardiorespiratory arrest, or sudden death. Just as an allergic reaction can vary from a mild and localized reaction to something widespread and life-threatening, the allergic component of allergic ACS presents the same way. In allergic ACS there may also be specific symptoms relating to the underlying allergic reaction, such as swelling of the face and tongue, wheeze, hives and potentially very low blood pressure (anaphylactic shock). Additional findings can include stridor, drowsiness, syncope, abdominal pain, diarrhea, vomiting, and acute pulmonary edema if severe.

Myocardial infarction, acute cardiac failure, and sudden cardiac death may also be seen. As high as 13% of adult-onset sudden cardiac deaths are coupled with mast cell degranulation concluding that Kounis syndrome can involve a silent allergic reaction.

== Pathophysiology ==
In allergy, mast cells release inflammatory substances such as histamine, neutral proteases, arachidonic acid derivatives, platelet activating factor and a variety of cytokines and chemokines. These mediators can precipitate coronary artery spasm and accelerate the rupture of atheromatous plaques of the coronary arteries. This interferes with the blood flow to the heart muscle and causes symptoms otherwise indistinguishable from unstable angina.

It is possible that even in people without direct evidence of allergy, the allergic response may be playing a role in acute coronary syndrome: markers of mast cell activation are found in people with ACS.

The main marker of mast cell activation is inducible macrophage protein 1a (MIP-1α), which binds to mast cells when they are near each other. After allergen exposure, MIP-1α transcription and expression are induced by resident mononuclear cells in the substantia propria, which consist of CD68+ macrophages and monocytes.

== Diagnosis ==
Kounis syndrome is often missed or underdiagnosed so understanding the disease process and clinical presentation while having a high suspicion for the problem is compulsory. It is important to focus on the duration of time between the trigger exposure and the onset of symptoms. The majority of the cases had a duration of under one hour while some had a duration of 6 hours. EKG, chest x-ray, echocardiography, and angiography are needed if suspicion for myocardial ischemia or infarction is present.

Patients with systemic allergic reactions associated with clinical, electrocardiographic, angiographic, echocardiographic and laboratory findings of acute myocardial ischemia should be diagnosed as having Kounis syndrome. EKG changes can be consistent with infarction most commonly in the inferior leads, ischemia, sinus bradycardia or tachycardia, heart block, atrial fibrillation, ventricular fibrillation, ventricular ectopic beats, QRS and QT prolongation, and findings similar to digoxin toxicity. Echocardiography assists with finding atherosclerotic stenosis and thrombosis.

Serum tryptase, histamine, immunoglobulins (IgE), cardiac enzymes, and cardiac troponins are helpful to confirm the diagnosis. In Kounis syndrome, the newer techniques such as thallium-201 single-photon emission computer tomography (SPECT) and 125I-15-(p-iodophenyl)-3-(R,S) methylpentadecanoic acid (BMIPP) SPECT have revealed severe myocardial ischemia while coronary angiography showed normal coronary arteries. Furthermore, with cardiac magnetic resonance imaging (MRI), the delayed contrast-enhanced images show normal washout in the subendocardial lesion area in patients with Kounis syndrome type I variant.

Other similar presentations to rule out include Takotsubo and hypersensitivity myocarditis.

=== Classification ===
Three variants of Kounis syndrome are recognised:

- Type I is also known as allergic vasospastic angina due to endothelial dysfunction. It occurs in people without underlying coronary artery disease or predisposing factors who have allergic ACS secondary to coronary artery spasm. Inflammatory mediators during an allergic reaction can cause arterial spasms with normal troponins. However, this may lead to myocardial infarction which will elevate troponins. MINOCA, which stands for myocardial infarction with non-obstructive coronary arteries is new clinical presentation that includes endothelial dysfunction and can be caused by this type I variant.
- Type II occurs in people with underlying asymptomatic coronary artery disease where an allergic reaction leads to either coronary artery spasm or plaque erosion. A myocardial infarction can also be seen here, in which case troponins would be elevated.
- Type III occurs in the setting of coronary thrombosis (including stent thrombosis) where aspirated thrombus stained with hematoxylin-eosin and Giemsa demonstrate the presence of eosinophils and mast cells respectively. It also includes those people who have died suddenly after previous coronary stent insertion, where evidence of an allergic reaction to the stent is found on post-mortem examination. Type III is subdivided now to stent thrombosis (subtype a) and stent restenosis (subtype b).

== Management ==
The management of these patients may be challenging for clinicians. Although beta blockers can be beneficial in ACS, they are contraindicated in Kounis syndrome. In allergic ACS, blocking beta receptors while giving epinephrine (which is the basis of treatment of anaphylaxis) can lead to an unopposed activity of α-adrenergic receptors which would aggravate the coronary spasm. Also opioids, indicated to relieve chest pain, may induce massive mast cell degranulation which in turn will worsen the anaphylaxis. They should hence be given carefully in such patients

=== Type I variant ===
Type I variant is treated based on its clinical presentation and how severe the allergic reaction is. If it is a mild reaction, then antihistamines and corticosteroids can help control the symptoms. If the patient's presentation involves anaphylaxis, intramuscular adrenaline should be given.

Treatment of the allergic event alone can abolish type I variant. Giving vasodilators such as nitroglycerin or calcium channel blockers is recommended. Consequences include hypotension and worsening of anaphylaxis. Antihistamine and mast cell stabilizers e.g. cromoglicate or nedocromil can be also considered.

=== Type II variant ===
Acute coronary event protocol is applied and type II can be treated similarly to type I for cardiac symptom control. Glucagon may be a better option than adrenaline for acute anaphylaxis in patients with prior use of chronic beta-blockers. In addition, beta-blockers can increase coronary vasospasm and ischemia. Opiates should be used with caution.

=== Type III variant ===
In addition to the application of the acute coronary syndrome protocol, thrombus aspiration, and placing a new stent is needed. The use of mast cell stabilizers in association with steroids and antihistamines is recommended. Harvesting of intrastent thrombus together with histological examination of aspirated material and staining for eosinophils and mast cells should be undertaken. When allergic symptoms are present following stent implantation, desensitization measures should be applied.

== History ==
While there are several older reports associating, clinically, allergy and the heart with names such as morphologic cardiac reactions, acute carditis, or lesions with basic characteristics of rheumatic carditis, the first full description of allergy-mediated acute coronary syndrome is attributed to the Greek cardiologist Nicholas Kounis, who in 1991 reported on the possible role of allergy in cases of coronary artery spasm (now, type I variant). Braunwald recognized the allergy-induced coronary artery occlusion mediated by these spasms. Three variants of Kounis syndrome were found and a study concluded that type 1 variant was most commonly seen followed by type 2 and 3 respectively.
