= Eosinopenia =

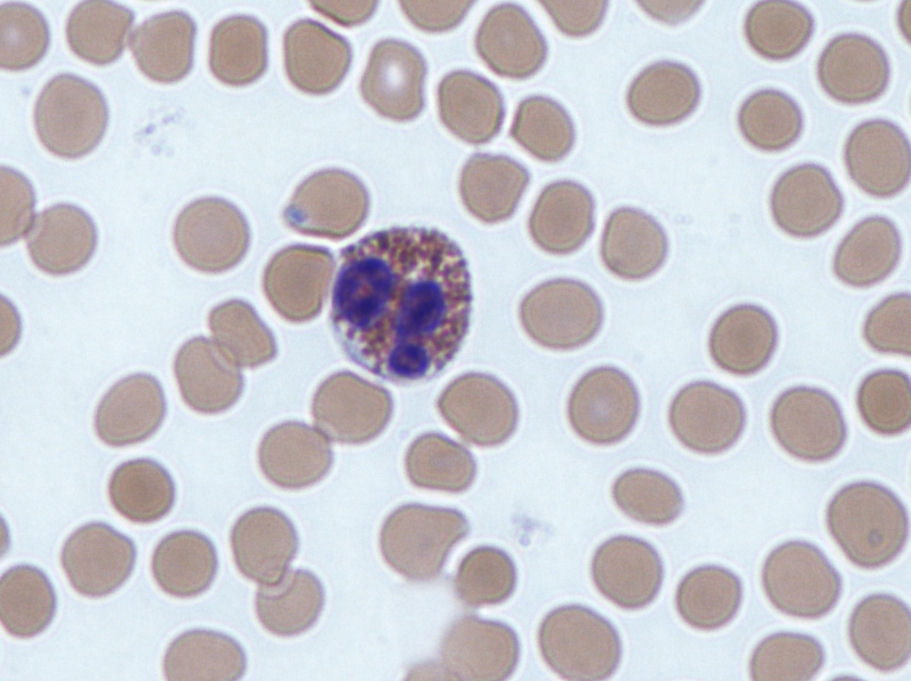
- An eosinophil in peripheral blood
- Specialty: Hematology

Eosinopenia is a condition where the number of eosinophils, a type of white blood cell, in circulating blood is lower than normal. Eosinophils are a type of granulocyte and consequently from the same cellular lineage as neutrophils, basophils, and mast cells. Along with the other granulocytes, eosinophils are part of the innate immune system and contribute to the defense of the body from pathogens. The most widely understood function of eosinophils is in association with allergy and parasitic disease processes, though their functions in other pathologies are the subject of ongoing research. The opposite phenomenon, in which the number of eosinophils present in the blood is higher than normal, is known as eosinophilia.

== Definition and diagnosis ==
The definition of eosinopenia varies in clinical practice, and normal eosinophil levels vary among the population. One common definition is an absolute eosinophil count of less than 50 cells/μLiter of blood. Other definitions include less than 10 cells/μLiter, while some clinical laboratories classify 0 cells/μLiter as within the acceptable range. The diagnosis of eosinopenia is challenging due to the low number of eosinophils normally present in blood and the fluctuations in eosinophil levels throughout the day.

== Causes ==
Eosinopenia is associated with several disease states and conditions, including inflammation and sepsis, endogenous catecholamines, and use of glucocorticoids. There are also medications that deliberately target eosinophils in order to treat eosinophil-mediated diseases, causing drug-induced eosinopenia.

=== Catecholamines ===
Unlike other granulocytes, eosinophil count decreases in response to release of catecholamines. A hypothesized mechanism contributing to this change is decreased eosinophil production by the bone marrow in response to catecholamines. Epinephrine is also believed to stimulate receptors through the β-adrenergic pathway to decrease eosinophils in peripheral blood.

=== Glucocorticoids ===
Use of glucocorticoids has been known to affect several blood components, including decreasing eosinophils. This cause of this effect is multifactorial. Glucocorticoids decrease the number of eosinophils in the circulation by causing them to exit the bloodstream and move into the tissue. The number of eosinophils released by the bone marrow is suppressed by glucocorticoids. It has also been theorized that glucocorticoids eliminate eosinophils in the blood by causing them to undergo apoptosis.

=== Eosinophil-depleting medications ===
Due to the harmful role of eosinophils in diseases such as eosinophilic asthma and eosinophilic granulomatosis with polyangiitis, drugs have been developed to purposefully diminish eosinophils in order to alleviate symptoms. Some examples of these drugs include mepolizumab, reslizumab, and benralizumab.

== Role in inflammation and sepsis ==
=== Pathomechanism ===
Although eosinopenia has long been recognized as a laboratory marker for infection, the mechanism for this phenomenon is currently unknown. One potential explanation is that eosinopenia may be an indication of immune dysregulation. In the body's response to a pathogen, the immune system activates "type 1 inflammation" which mobilizes certain immune cells to clear pathogens. This response can produce collateral damage of host tissue. To balance this, eosinophils are one component of "type 2 inflammation" that can begin to mend the tissue. As a result, eosinopenia may be a sign that the body has not mounted an appropriate type 2 inflammation response, so it may be doing more damage than normal to surrounding tissue. Another theory postulates that eosinophils in sepsis travel out of the blood and may contribute to tissue damage, causing relative eosinopenia in the blood with elevated eosinophils in affected tissue. Eosinophils have been shown to have a cytotoxic effect on bacteria, which contributes to surrounding tissue damage.

=== Clinical outcomes and diagnostic utility ===
Persistent eosinopenia in sepsis is independently associated with worse clinical outcomes, including increased mortality and increased rates of hospital readmission. It is unknown if eosinophils contribute directly to clearing pathogens in sepsis or if their absence is only an indicator that the immune system is dysregulated. The causative role of eosinopenia to poor survival in sepsis, if it exists, has yet to be established.

The use of eosinopenia as a diagnostic tool in sepsis is debatable. Although there is a high incidence of eosinopenia in sepsis, it is not more effective as a biomarker than more commonly utilized indicators of sepsis, such as procalcitonin (PCT) and C-reactive protein (CRP). One advantage it does have compared these biomarkers is that it is generally a faster and cheaper test.

== Role in COVID-19 ==
=== Disease course and risk stratification ===
Eosinopenia is a possible laboratory finding in patients who present with COVID-19 and is associated with disease severity, though it is not pathognomonic. One study found that 53% of patients admitted for COVID-19 had eosinopenia at time of admission; in another study of fatal COVID-19 cases, 81% of patients had eosinopenia. In patients with eosinopenia who present with COVID-19, eosinophil counts usually return to normal levels as they recover. In fatal cases of COVID-19, eosinophil counts remain low for the duration of the disease. It is unclear if this eosinopenia contributes to the disease course. The presence of eosinopenia has been included in several risk stratification scores, such as the COVID-19-REAL score and PARIS score, which both use different definitions of eosinopenia as part of several factors to screen for COVID-19. Eosinopenia has also been proposed as a marker for distinguishing COVID-19 from influenza virus infection, since patients diagnosed with COVID-19 have slightly lower eosinophil counts than patients diagnosed with influenza.

=== Pathomechanism ===
Though the most widely known role of eosinophils is in regards to allergy and parasitic infections, recent research has found evidence for an antiviral function of eosinophils. Research has shown that mice that were genetically modified to have more eosinophils than normal were able to combat RSV infection more effectively than normal mice, while genetically eosinophil-depleted mice were less effective. The precise mechanism for this function is undetermined, though some elements of the eosinophil response to viruses include nitric oxide production and inactivation of viruses. Though there is early research on the role of eosinophils in response to respiratory viruses, this function is still uncertain and requires additional research in order to define the extent to which eosinophils participate in antiviral immune response as well as clinical relevancy.

The cause of eosinopenia in COVID-19 infection is also unknown at this time. Some proposed contributory mechanisms include increased movement of eosinophils out of the blood into tissue, decreased generation or output of eosinophils from the bone barrow, and shorter lifespan within the blood. One aspect of severe COVID-19 that may contribute to eosinopenia is the cytokine storm. In this disorder, cytokines may interact with eosinophils and modulate their activity, movement, or survival.

== See also ==
- Eosinophilia
- Hypereosinophilia
