= Basopenia =

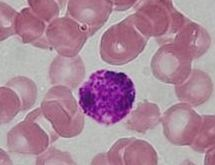
- A peripheral blood basophil stained with a Romanovsky stain.
- Specialty: Hematology

Basopenia (or basocytopenia) is a form of agranulocytosis associated with a deficiency of basophils. It has been proposed as an indicator of ovulation. It is difficult to detect without flow cytometry, because normal levels are so low. It can be defined as less than 0.01 billion / L. Basopenia has been observed in a number of conditions, including after the administration of corticosteroids and in disease states such as chronic urticaria and lupus.

== Mechanism ==
Basophils, which are granulocytes, account for only a small proportion of the total leukocyte count, and are responsible for controlling the immune response during parasitic infections. In case of activation, basophils can secrete histamine, proteoglycans (e.g. heparin and chondroitin), leukotrienes (LTD-4), and several cytokines. Although there is a positive correlation between higher basophil counts and high blood histamine concentrations, this correlation is not indicative of cause and effect.

== Associated conditions ==
- Hereditary absence of basophils (very rare)
- Elevated levels of glucocorticoids
- Hyperthyroidism or treatment with thyroid hormones
- Ovulation
- Hypersensitivity reactions

- urticaria
- Anaphylaxis
- Drug-induced reactions

- Leukocytosis (in association with diverse disorders)
