= Nicholas Kounis =

Nicholas George Kounis is professor emeritus of cardiology in the University of Patras and scientific cardiology advisor at Saint Andrews (Agios Andreas) State General Hospital Patras and at the Department of cardiology of University of Patras Medical School, Patras, Greece.

== Early life and education ==
He was born in Patras from Greek parents after his father's return from the United States of America where he emigrated in 1914, became an American citizen, served in the American Army, fought and injured in action in France during the 1st World War. This enabled Dr Kounis to get also the American citizenship. After bright elementary and Lyceum studies he passed the entrance examinations and entered first of all candidates in the Athens University Medical School. There, he had also a bright undergraduate career and qualified first of all students after 5 and a half years (normally the course lasts 6 years) as MD. Following this, he served the compulsory military service in the Greek Army for 2 and a half years as a Medical Lieutenant in various army units and areas including Cyprus. After finishing the army service, he performed the compulsory service as a medical practitioner in rural Greek areas.

In 1971, he moved to the United Kingdom where he undertook postgraduate medical training first in medicine and later in adult and pediatric cardiology as house officer, senior house officer, registrar, senior registrar and clinical tutor for 10 years under famous teachers including the Queen's physician David Somerset Short of Aberdeen University, Scotland and professor James Francis "Frank" Pantridge of Queen's University of Belfast, Northern Ireland. During this period he passed the board specialty examinations in medicine, the board specialty examinations in Cardiology and received his doctorate in 1976 from Athens University with doctoral thesis: Contribution to the prevention and treatment of chronic thromboembolism with a new regimen including Arvin, heparin, phenformin, orabolin and warfarin.

== Career ==
On his return to Greece, in 1981, he was appointed consultant cardiologist and director of the Intensive Care Unit at “Saint Andrews University Hospital”, Department of medicine, University of Patras Medical School. It was during this period when he treated two patients who developed angina progressing to acute myocardial infarction following an allergic reaction after shellfish ingestion. Following this observation, Paris Constantinides MD Vienna, Austria and PhD Montreal, Canada who was the first to discover that the junctions between endothelial cells that line human atheromatous plaques are open in contrast to closed junctions over the normal arterial intima, in an editorial in the journal “Circulation” raised the possibility that “even ordinary reactions could promote plaque disruption”.

One of his contributions to medical science is describing the Kounis syndrome, the name given to "anaphylactic CHD [coronary heart disease] including patients with drug eluting coronary stents". He received his MD and PhD from Athens Medical School. He worked in various hospitals in Greece including a 10-year term as consultant and director of the Intensive Care Unit of the department of cardiology of the University of Patras Medical School and culminating in an appointment to Patras Highest Institute of Education and Technology Department of Medical Sciences [ATEI of Patras, now University of Patras] in 1988.

Kounis is an emeritus professor of medicine, research advisor to the Cardiology department of University of Patras, Greece, Chief Editor of the medical Journal "Achaiki Iatriki" and is doing some private practice sessions. He lives in Patras, Achaia, Greece with his wife, daughter, son and a grandson.

=== Research ===
His description of Kounis syndrome, denoting for the first time a hypersensitivity blow up inside the coronary, cerebral and mesenteric arteries, might have profound clinical and therapeutic implications because he discovered that the same mediators, released during acute allergic episodes, are increased in blood or urine of patients with acute coronary syndromes of nonallergic etiology. Consequently, the same substances from the same cells are present in both acute allergic episodes and acute coronary syndromes. Drugs and natural molecules which stabilize mast cell membrane, monoclonal antibodies that protect mast cell surface and drugs that are targeting at stem cell factor which is essential for mast cell growth, proliferation, survival, adhesion, homing and differentiation could emerge as novel therapeutic modalities capable of preventing acute coronary, cerebrovascular and other arterial events.

== Selected publications ==
- "Atropine and bradycardia after myocardial infarction". Kounis NG, Chopra RK. Ann Intern Med 1974; 81: 117–8.
- "Oxytetracycline-induced thrombocytopenic purpura". Kounis NG. JAMA. 1975; 231: 734–5.
- Micturition syncope, hypokalemia, and atrial fibrillation. Kounis NG, Kenmure AC. JAMA 1976; 236: 954
- "Iliacus hematoma syndrome." Kounis N G, Macauley MB, Ghorbal MS. Canadian Medical Association Journal 1975; 112: 872–873.
- "Cardiopathia Fantastica: Munchhausen syndrome with cardiac symptoms." Kounis NG. British Journal of Clinical Practice 1979; 33: 77–72.
- "Kounis syndrome (allergic angina and allergic myocardial infarction): A natural paradigm?" Kounis NG. International Journal of Cardiology 2006; 110: 7–14.
- "Coronary Artery Stents" Kounis NG, Kounis GN, Kouni SN. N Engl J Med 2006; 354: 2076-8
- "Drug-eluting stent thrombosis: the Kounis hypersensitivity-associated acute coronary syndrome revisited". Chen JP, Hou D, Pendyala L, Goudevenos JA, Kounis NG. JACC Cardiovasc Interv 2009; 2: 583–93. Review.
- Everolimus-eluting versus paclitaxel-eluting stents. Kounis NG, Goudevenos JA. Lancet 2010;375:1160-3.
