= Fenpiverinium =

Chemical compound

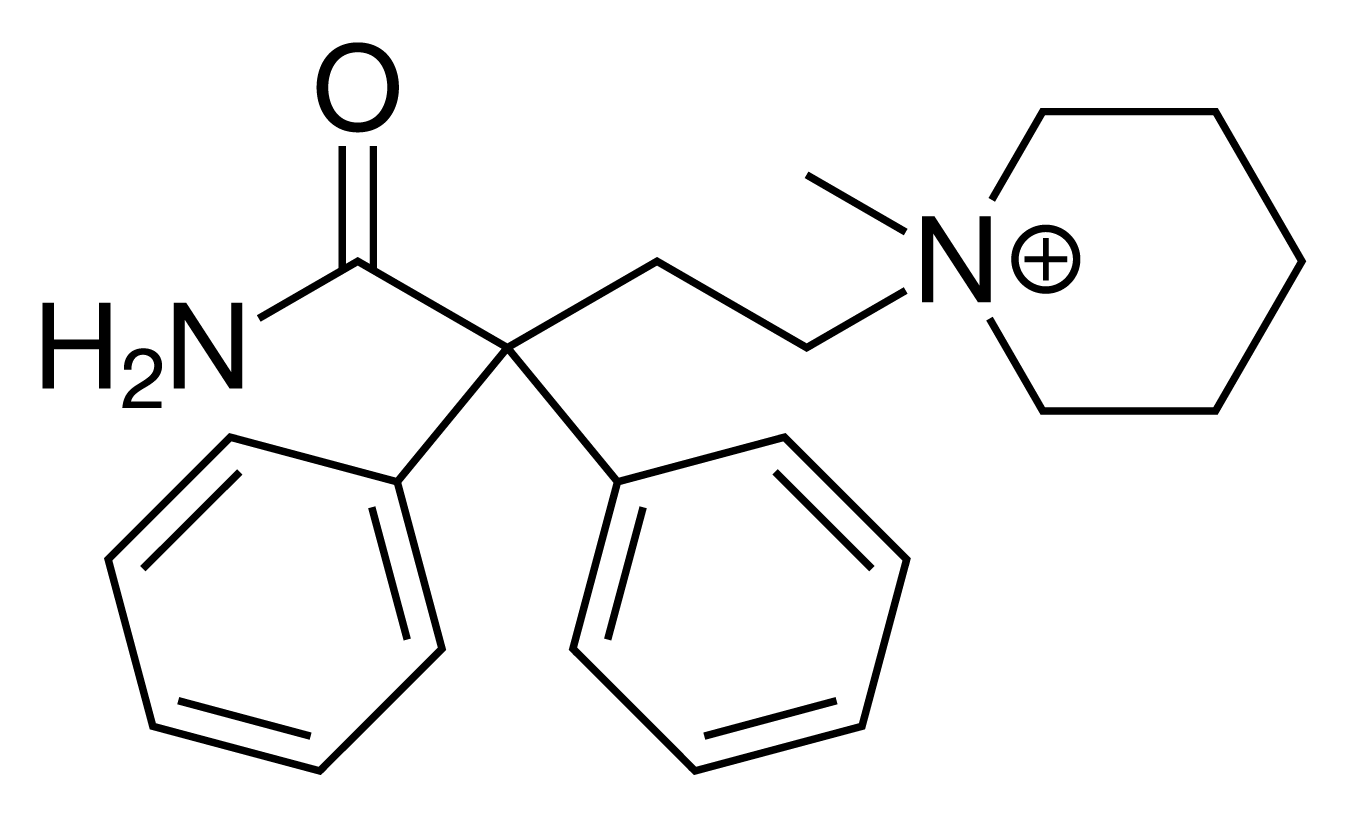

Clinical data
- ATC code: A03AB21 (WHO)

Identifiers
- IUPAC name: 1-(4-Amino-4-oxo-3,3-diphenylbutyl)-1-methylpiperidinium
- CAS Number: 258329-46-3
- PubChem CID: 71490
- ChemSpider: 64566
- UNII: KP2L8LC73B
- CompTox Dashboard (EPA): DTXSID7048376

Chemical and physical data
- Formula: C_{22}H_{29}N_{2}O^{+}
- Molar mass: 337.487 g·mol^{−1}
- 3D model (JSmol): Interactive image
- SMILES: C[N+]1(CCCCC1)CCC(C2=CC=CC=C2)(C3=CC=CC=C3)C(=O)N
- InChI: InChI=1S/C22H28N2O/c1-24(16-9-4-10-17-24)18-15-22(21(23)25,19-11-5-2-6-12-19)20-13-7-3-8-14-20/h2-3,5-8,11-14H,4,9-10,15-18H2,1H3,(H-,23,25)/p+1; Key:QDIYJDPBMZUZEH-UHFFFAOYSA-O

Fenpiverinium is an anticholinergic and antispasmodic compound; it is marketed as a combination drug with pitofenone hydrochloride and either nimesulide or metamizole in Eastern Europe and India to treat smooth muscle spasms and pain.

The combination with metamizole was removed from the market in Lithuania for safety reasons in 2000 and a boxed warning against use by children and adolescents was added in Serbia in 2005. In 2016 India banned marketing of the combination with nimesulide along with 344 other combination drugs; the order was overturned in December and appealed by the Government in January 2017.
