= Trinder glucose activity test =

- Purpose: determine the presence of glucose

The Trinder glucose activity test is a diagnostic test used in medicine to determine the presence of glucose or glucose oxidase. The test employs the Trinder reagent, and is a colour change test resulting from the Trinder reaction.

The Trinder reagent, named after P. Trinder of the Biochemistry Department of the Royal Infirmary in Sunderland (see the article listed in further reading), comprises an aminoantipyrine (such as 4-aminoantipyrine) and phenol (p-hydroxybenzene).

The Trinder reaction is the reaction between hydrogen peroxide and the phenol and aminoantipyrine to form a quinone (quinoneimine), catalyzed by the presence of a peroxidase (such as horseradish peroxidase). The hydrogen peroxide is itself produced by an initial reaction where the glucose is oxidised in the presence of the glucose oxidase catalyst into H_{2}O_{2} and gluconic acid.

The quinone is red-violet in colour, with the intensity of the colour being in proportion to the glucose concentration. The colour is measured at 505 nm, 510 nm, or 540 nm.

Diagnostic kits containing the Trinder reagent are available, including one from Sigma-Aldrich.

The Stanbio Single Reagent Glucose Method is based upon the Trinder technique.
