= Pitofenone =

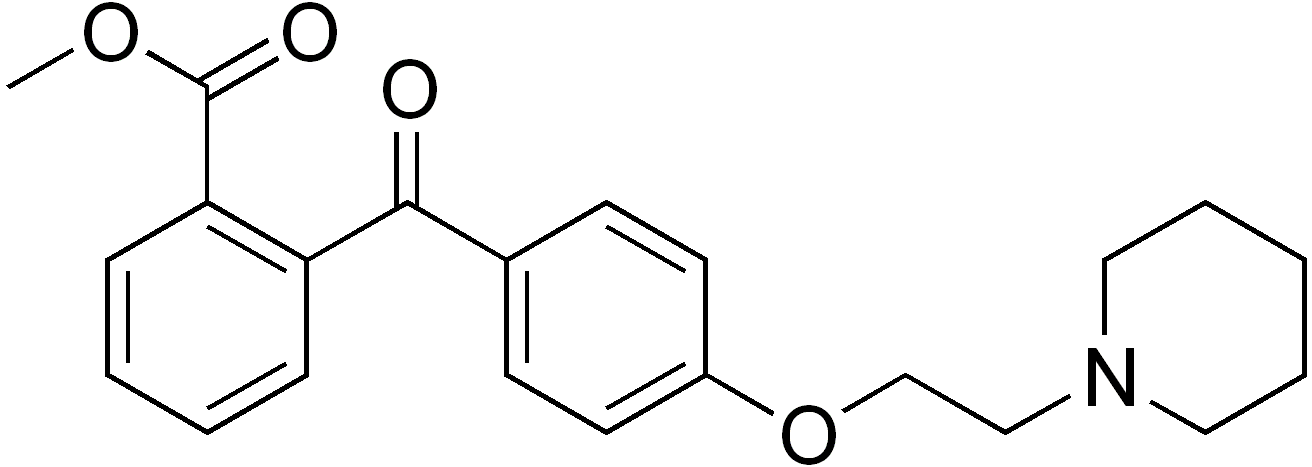

Names
- Preferred IUPAC name Methyl 2-{4-[2-(piperidin-1-yl)ethoxy]benzoyl}benzoate

Identifiers
CAS Number	54063-52-4
3D model (JSmol)	Interactive image
ChemSpider	108096
PubChem CID	121098
UNII	M09N8K7YJY
CompTox Dashboard (EPA)	DTXSID6048381
- InChI: InChI=1S/C22H25NO4/c1-26-22(25)20-8-4-3-7-19(20)21(24)17-9-11-18(12-10-17)27-16-15-23-13-5-2-6-14-23/h3-4,7-12H,2,5-6,13-16H2,1H3 Key: NZHMAQSCHUSSSJ-UHFFFAOYSA-Nanalgesics; InChI=1/C22H25NO4/c1-26-22(25)20-8-4-3-7-19(20)21(24)17-9-11-18(12-10-17)27-16-15-23-13-5-2-6-14-23/h3-4,7-12H,2,5-6,13-16H2,1H3 Key: NZHMAQSCHUSSSJ-UHFFFAOYAG
- SMILES: COC(=O)C1=CC=CC=C1C(=O)C2=CC=C(C=C2)OCCN3CCCCC3

Properties
Chemical formula	C_{22}H_{25}NO_{4}
Molar mass	367.445 g·mol^{−1}
Melting point	168-169 °C (Hydrochloride)

Pharmacology
ATC code	A03DA02 (WHO)
- Except where otherwise noted, data are given for materials in their standard state (at 25 °C [77 °F], 100 kPa). verify (what is ?) Infobox references

Pitofenone is an antispasmodic.

Pitofenone is typically used in combination with fenpiverinium bromide, and metamizole sodium. Previously produced as Baralgin by Sanofi Aventis, the drug is currently sold in Eastern Europe under various trade names, including Spasmalgon (Actavis, Bulgaria), Revalgin (Shreya, India), Spasgan (Wockhardt, India), Bral (Micro Labs, India), and others. It relieves pain and spasms of smooth muscles.
