= Sumanirole =

Chemical compound

Clinical data
- Other names: PNU-95,666
- ATC code: none

Identifiers
- IUPAC name: (R)-5,6-Dihydro-5-(methylamino)-4H-imidazo[4,5,1-ij]quinolin-2(1H)-one
- CAS Number: 179386-43-7 179386-44-8 (maleate)
- PubChem CID: 9818479
- IUPHAR/BPS: 3949
- ChemSpider: 7994229
- UNII: 3E93IV1U45
- ChEMBL: ChEMBL419792
- CompTox Dashboard (EPA): DTXSID00870144

Chemical and physical data
- Formula: C_{11}H_{13}N_{3}O
- Molar mass: 203.245 g·mol^{−1}
- 3D model (JSmol): Interactive image
- SMILES: CN[C@@H]1Cc2cccc3[nH]c(=O)n(C1)c23

Sumanirole (PNU-95,666) is a highly selective D_{2} receptor full agonist, the first of its kind to be discovered. It was developed for the treatment of Parkinson's disease and restless leg syndrome. While it has never been approved for medical use it is a highly valuable tool compound for basic research to identify neurobiological mechanisms that are based on a dopamine D_{2}-linked (vs. D_{1}-, D_{3}-, D_{4}-, and D_{5}-linked) mechanism of action.

In 2004, Pfizer announced the end of their clinical development program for sumanirole, citing “recent studies that failed to sufficiently distinguish sumanirole from currently available therapies”.

== See also ==
- List of investigational Parkinson's disease drugs
- List of investigational restless legs syndrome drugs
- Ropinirole
- PNU-91356A
