= Antipyrine and benzocaine ear drops =

Medication for the treatment of ear pain caused by otitis media

Antipyrine and benzocaine ear drops is a medication for the treatment of ear pain caused by otitis media. It combines antipyrine, an NSAID, and benzocaine, a local anaesthetic in order to treat ear pain, alongside hydroxyquinoline sulfate, an antiseptic and preservative. Its trade names include Auralgan, Aurodex, Auroto, among others, and is abbreviated as A/B otic drops.

== Medical uses ==
A/B otic drops is indicated for ear pain caused by otitis media. It is used every 2–3 hours as needed for pain.

A/B otic drops is also indicated for the removal of excessive or impacted cerumen. To clear cerumen, it is used 3 times a day for 2–3 days.

== Ingredients ==
Each 1 ml of A/B otic drops contains:

- Antipyrine 54 mg
- Benzocaine 14 mg
- Glycerin and Hydroxyquinoline Sulfate USP

== Clinical pharmacology ==
A/B otic drops are effective because antipyrine reduces pain and inflammation and benzocaine numbs the ear.

== Reformulation ==
In 2008, Auralgan was reformulated to include acetic acid and U-polycosanol 410, in addition to antipyrine and benzocaine. Due to this reformulation, pharmacies could no longer substitute the generic antipyrine/benzocaine drops for a prescription written as "Auralgan". The price for the new formulation was roughly $150.00 compared to the generic price of $2.00.

== United States ban on manufacture ==
In 2015, in accordance with their initiative to remove unapproved prescription drugs from the market, the FDA mandated that companies stop manufacturing this drug or be subject to criminal charges. The FDA has not evaluated this drug for safety, effectiveness or quality and has concerns about inappropriate dosing and risk of contamination during the manufacturing process. The FDA adverse event reporting database does not have any known cases of adverse events where Auralgan is the primary suspect.
