= Pyrazolone =

Chemical compound

Pyrazolone is 5-membered heterocycle containing two adjacent nitrogen atoms. It can be viewed as a derivative of pyrazole possessing an additional carbonyl (C=O) group. Compounds containing this functional group are useful commercially in analgesics and dyes.

== Structure and synthesis ==
Pyrazolone can exist in two isomers: 3-pyrazolone and 4-pyrazolone.

Chemical structures of 3-pyrazolone (left) and 4-pyrazolone (right)

These isomers can interconvert via lactam–lactim and imine–enamine tautomerism; these conversion often display photochromism. For pyrazolone derivatives, the 3-pyrazolone isomer can be stabilized with N-alkyl or N-aryl substituents.

The first synthesis of pyrazolones was reported in 1883 by Ludwig Knorr, via a condensation reaction between ethyl acetoacetate and phenylhydrazine.

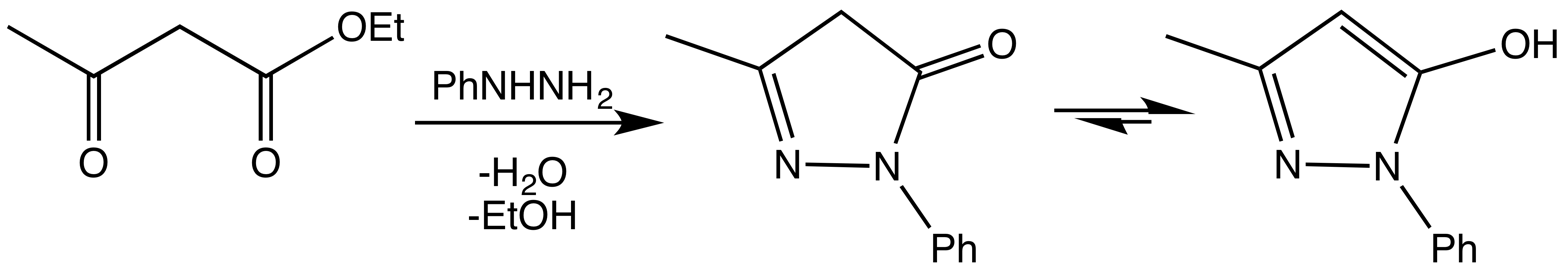

Many pyrazolones are produced by functionalization of preformed pyrazolones.

== Applications ==
=== Pharmaceuticals ===
Antipyrine (phenazone), the earliest pyrazolone based drug

Pyrazolones are amongst the oldest synthetic pharmaceuticals, starting with the introduction of antipyrine (phenazone) in 1880s. The compounds generally act as analgesics and include dipyrone (Metamizole), aminophenazone, ampyrone, famprofazone, morazone, nifenazone, piperylon and propyphenazone. Of these dipyrone (the so-called "Mexican aspirin") is perhaps the most widely used.

The basic structure has been also used in a number of newer drugs of other effects. Edaravone is useful for prevention and/or therapy of arterial wall injury. Eltrombopag is used to address low blood platelet count.

=== Dyes ===
Pyrazolone groups are present in several important dyes. They are commonly used in combination with azo groups to give a sub-family of azo dyes; sometimes referred to as azopyrazolones (tartrazine, orange B, mordant red 19, yellow 2G). Acid Yellow 17, Acid Yellow 23 (tartrazine), Pigment Yellow 13, and Pigment Red 38 are produced on the multi-ton scale annually.

=== Ligands ===
Pyrazolones have been studied as ligands.
