= PNU-91356A =

Chemical compound

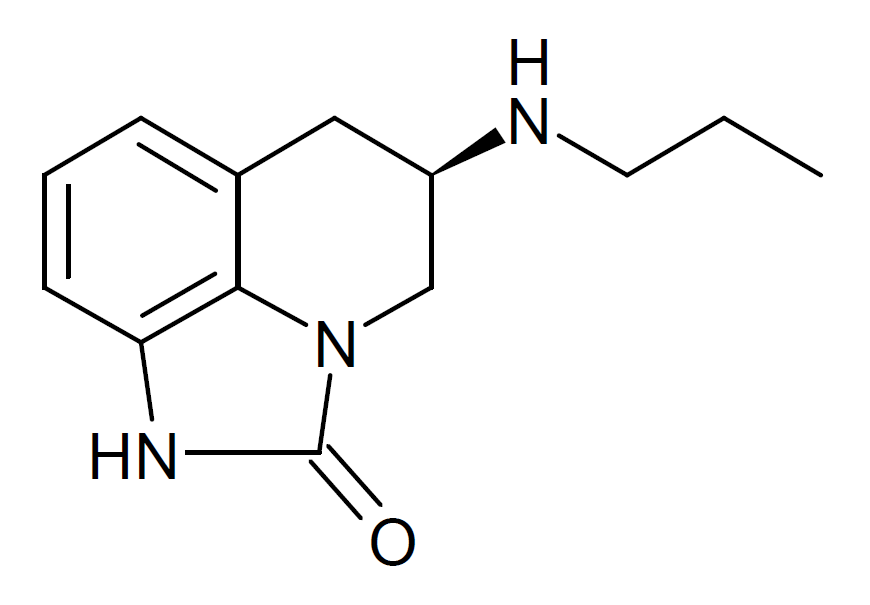

Clinical data
- ATC code: none

Identifiers
- IUPAC name: (10R)-10-(propylamino)-1,3-diazatricyclo[6.3.1.04,12]dodeca-4,6,8(12)-trien-2-one
- CAS Number: 152886-85-6
- PubChem CID: 132955
- UNII: K5FQ4JYU8H
- CompTox Dashboard (EPA): DTXSID60934630

Chemical and physical data
- Formula: C_{13}H_{17}N_{3}O
- Molar mass: 231.299 g·mol^{−1}
- 3D model (JSmol): Interactive image
- SMILES: CCCNC1CC2=C3C(=CC=C2)NC(=O)N3C1
- InChI: InChI=1S/C13H17N3O/c1-2-6-14-10-7-9-4-3-5-11-12(9)16(8-10)13(17)15-11/h3-5,10,14H,2,6-8H2,1H3,(H,15,17)/t10-/m1/s1; Key:XTWUNLMHXDDOMD-SNVBAGLBSA-N

PNU-91356A (U-91356) is a drug used in scientific research which acts as a potent and reasonably selective agonist of the dopamine receptor D_{2}, with lower affinity for the related D_{3} and D_{4} subtypes and the 5-HT_{1A} receptor.

== See also ==
- Sumanirole
