= Basophil =

Type of white blood cell

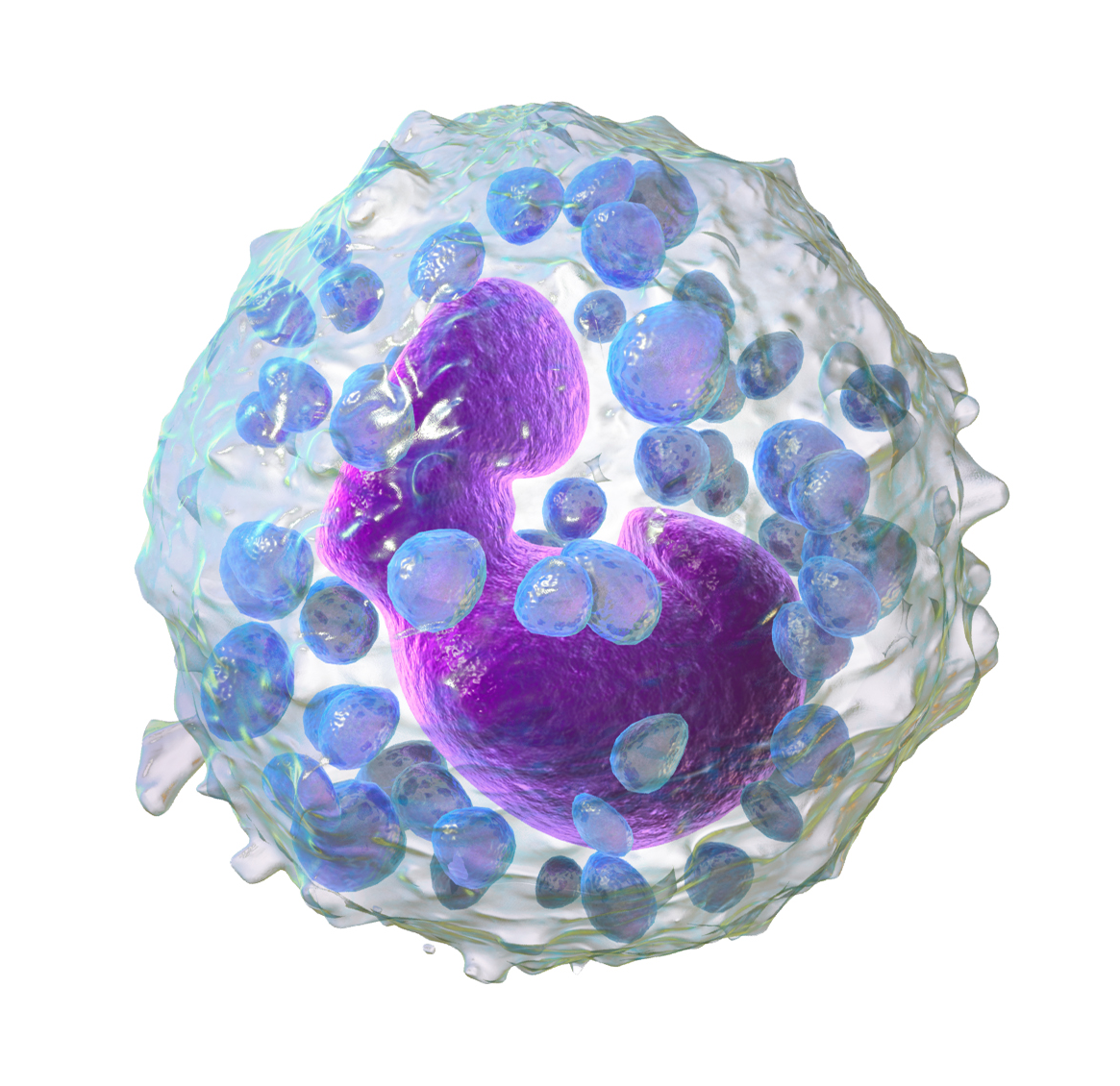
- 3D rendering of a basophil

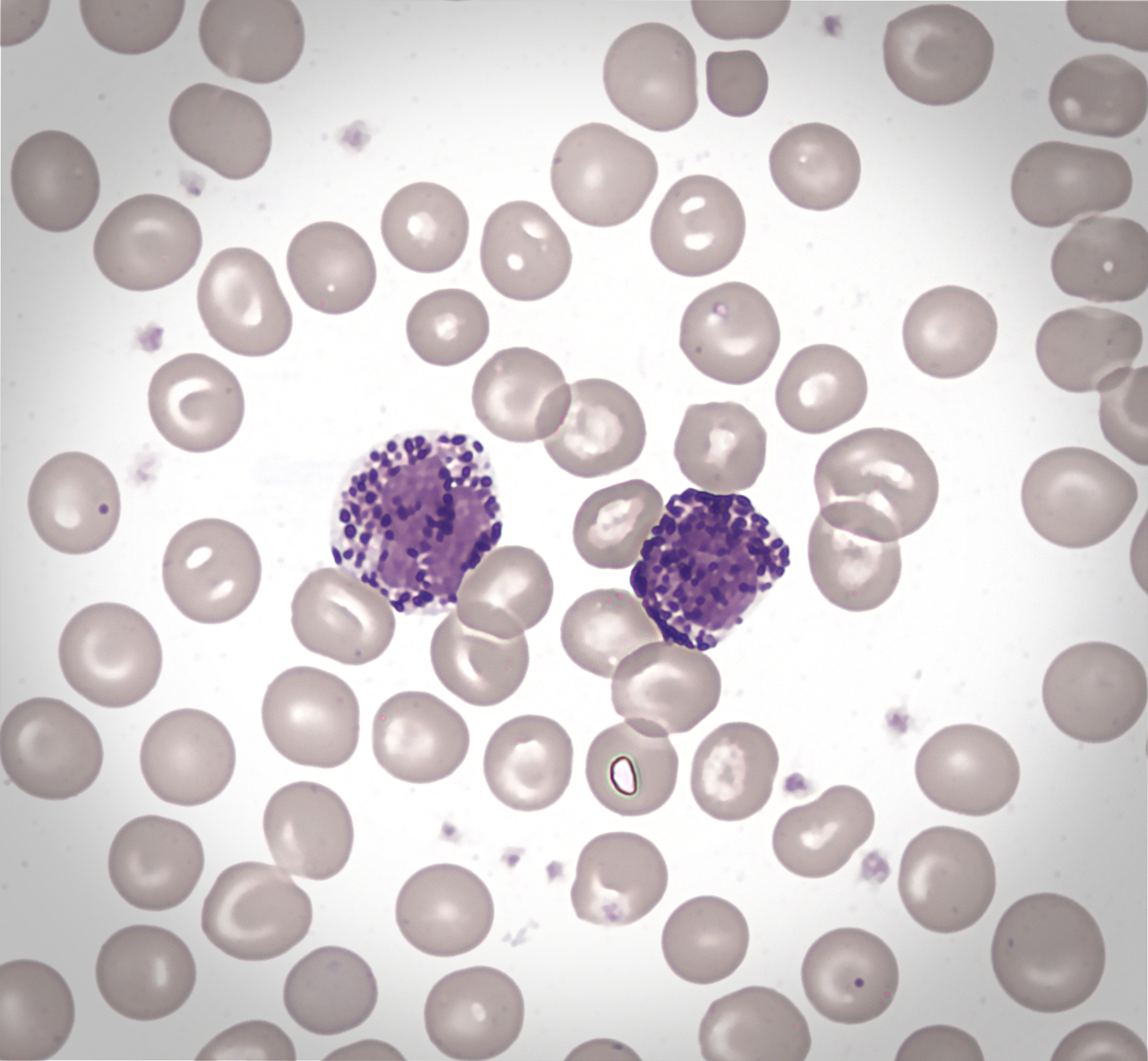
- Dyed basophils among red blood cells with poikilocytosis

Details
- System: Immune system

Identifiers
- MeSH: D001491
- TH: H2.00.04.1.02022
- FMA: 62862

Basophils are a type of white blood cell. Basophils are the least common type of granulocyte, representing about 0.5% to 1% of circulating white blood cells. They are the largest type of granulocyte. They are responsible for inflammatory reactions during immune response, as well as in the formation of acute and chronic allergic diseases, including anaphylaxis, asthma, atopic dermatitis and hay fever. They also produce compounds that coordinate immune responses, including histamine and serotonin that induce inflammation, and heparin that prevents blood clotting, although there are less than that found in mast cell granules. Mast cells were once thought to be basophils that migrated from the blood into their resident tissues (connective tissue), but they are now known to be different types of cells.

Basophils were discovered in 1879 by German physician Paul Ehrlich, who one year earlier had found a cell type present in tissues that he termed mastzellen (now mast cells). Ehrlich received the 1908 Nobel Prize in Physiology or Medicine for his discoveries.

The name comes from the fact that these leukocytes are basophilic, i.e., they are susceptible to staining by basic dyes, as shown in the picture.

== Structure ==
Basophils contain large cytoplasmic granules which obscure the cell nucleus under the microscope when stained. However, when unstained, the nucleus is visible and it usually has two lobes. The mast cell, another granulocyte, is similar in appearance and function. Both cell types store histamine, a chemical that is secreted by the cells when stimulated. However, they arise from different branches of hematopoiesis, and mast cells usually do not circulate in the blood stream, but instead are located in connective tissue. Like all circulating granulocytes, basophils can be recruited out of the blood into a tissue when needed.

== Function ==
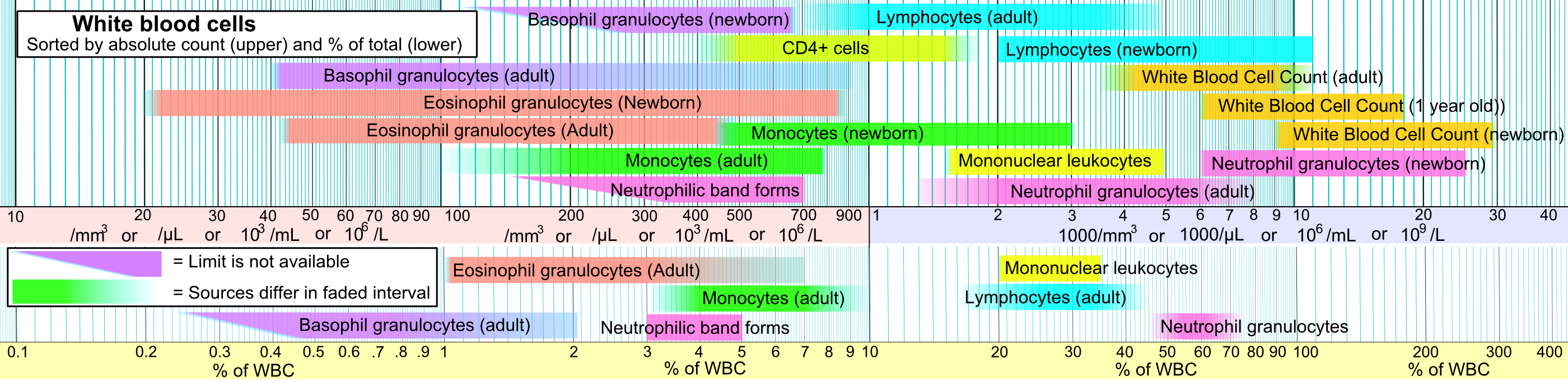
Reference ranges for blood tests of white blood cells, comparing basophil amount (shown in violet) with other cells.

Basophils appear in many specific kinds of inflammatory reactions, particularly those that cause allergic symptoms. Basophils contain anticoagulant heparin, which prevents blood from clotting too quickly. They also contain the vasodilator histamine, which promotes blood flow to tissues. They can be found in unusually high numbers at sites of ectoparasite infection (e.g. ticks).

Like eosinophils, basophils play a role in both parasitic infections and allergies. They are found in tissues where allergic reactions are occurring and probably contribute to the severity of these reactions. Basophils have protein receptors on their cell surface that bind IgE, an immunoglobulin involved in macroparasite defense and allergy. It is the bound IgE antibody that confers a selective response of these cells to environmental substances (e.g., pollen proteins or helminth antigens).

Recent studies in mice suggest that basophils may also regulate the behavior of T cells and mediate the magnitude of the secondary immune response.

=== CD200 ===
Basophil function is inhibited by CD200. Herpesvirus-6, herpesvirus-7, and herpesvirus-8 produce a CD200 homolog which also inhibits basophil function. This suggests that basophils may play a role in the immune response to these viruses. The role of basophils in the immune response to these viruses is further supported by findings that the CD200 receptor is expressed more frequently in basophils than in other circulating leukocytes.

=== Secretions ===
Basophils arise and mature in bone marrow. When activated, basophils degranulate to release histamine, proteoglycans (e.g. heparin and chondroitin), and proteolytic enzymes (e.g. elastase and lysophospholipase). They also secrete lipid mediators like leukotrienes (LTD-4), and several cytokines. Histamine and proteoglycans are pre-stored in the cell's granules while the other secreted substances are newly generated. Each of these substances contributes to inflammation. Recent evidence suggests that basophils are an important source of the cytokine, interleukin-4, perhaps more important than T cells. Interleukin-4 is considered one of the critical cytokines in the development of allergies and the production of IgE antibody by the immune system. There are other substances that can activate basophils to secrete which suggests that these cells have other roles in inflammation.

The degranulation of basophils can be investigated in vitro by using flow cytometry and the so-called basophil-activation-test (BAT). Especially, in the diagnosis of allergies including of drug reactions (e.g. induced by contrast medium), the BAT is of great impact.

Basopenia (a low basophil count) is difficult to demonstrate as the normal basophil count is so low; it has been reported in association with autoimmune urticaria (a chronic itching condition). Basophilia is also uncommon but may be seen in some forms of leukemia or lymphoma.

== Clinical significance ==
=== Immunophenotyping ===
Basophils of mice and humans have consistent immunophenotypes, including FcεRI^{+}, CD123, CD49b(DX-5)^{+}, CD69^{+}, Thy-1.2^{+}, 2B4^{+}, CD11b^{dull}, CD117(c-kit)^{−}, CD24^{−}, CD19^{−}, CD80^{−}, CD14^{−}, CD23^{−}, Ly49c^{−}, CD122^{−}, CD11c^{−}, Gr-1^{−}, NK1.1^{−}, B220^{−}, CD3^{−}, γδTCR^{−}, αβTCR^{−}, α_{4} and β_{4}-integrin negative.

Recently, Heneberg proposed that basophils may be defined as the cellular population positive for CD13, CD44, CD54, CD63, CD69, CD107a, CD123, CD164, CD193/ CCR3, CD203c, TLR-4, and FcεRI. When activated, some additional surface markers are known to be upregulated (CD13, CD107a, CD164), or surface-exposed (CD63, and the ectoenzyme CD203c).

=== Allergy diagnosis ===
Basophils are easily isolated from venous blood and present good "indicator cells" of an IgE-mediated allergic response based on the upregulation of activation markers such as CD63 and/or CD203c upon suspect allergen stimulation. Therefore, the BAT serves to confirm IgE-mediated allergy following uncertain results from classical testing based on anamnesis, skin testing or specific IgE results. More recently, BAT has also been used for the monitoring of successful allergen immunotherapy (desensitization) to differentiate short-term desensitization versus sustained unresponsiveness to the allergen.

== Etymology and pronunciation ==
The word basophil uses combining forms of baso- + -phil, yielding "base-loving".

== Additional images ==
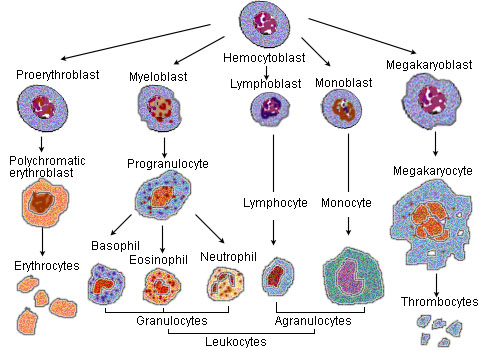
Blood cell lineage

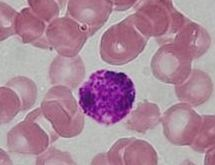
Alternate stain of a basophil

== See also ==
- Allergy
- Diamine oxidase
- Eosinophil
- Food intolerance
- Histamine
- Histamine intolerance
- Histamine N-methyltransferase or HNMT
- Mast cell
- List of distinct cell types in the adult human body
