= Ampyrone =

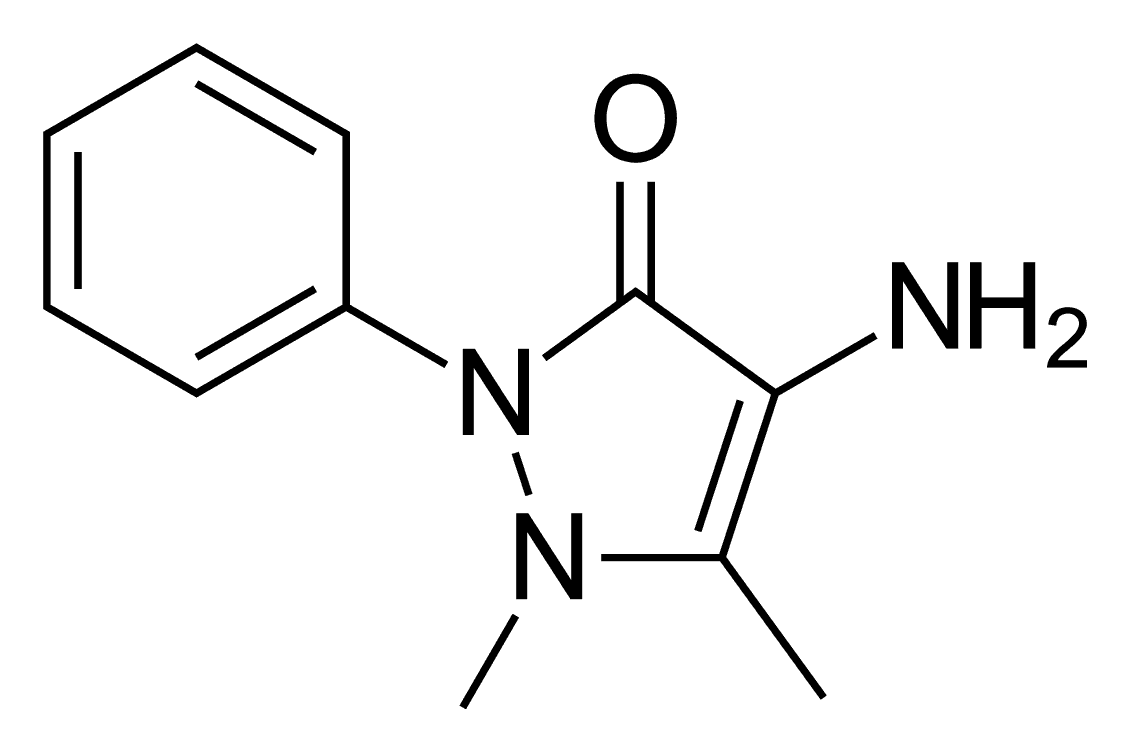

Names
- Preferred IUPAC name 4-Amino-1,5-dimethyl-2-phenyl-3H-pyrazol-3-one
- Other names solvapyrin A, aminoazophene, aminoantipyrene, aminoantipyrine, metapyrazone

Identifiers
CAS Number	83-07-8
3D model (JSmol)	Interactive image
ChEBI	CHEBI:59026
ChEMBL	ChEMBL1165011
ChemSpider	2066
ECHA InfoCard	100.001.321
PubChem CID	2151
UNII	0M0B7474RA
CompTox Dashboard (EPA)	DTXSID8048860
- InChI: InChI=1S/C11H13N3O/c1-8-10(12)11(15)14(13(8)2)9-6-4-3-5-7-9/h3-7H,12H2,1-2H3 Key: RLFWWDJHLFCNIJ-UHFFFAOYSA-N; InChI=1/C11H13N3O/c1-8-10(12)11(15)14(13(8)2)9-6-4-3-5-7-9/h3-7H,12H2,1-2H3 Key: RLFWWDJHLFCNIJ-UHFFFAOYAT
- SMILES: O=C2\C(=C(/N(N2c1ccccc1)C)C)N

Properties
Chemical formula	C_{11}H_{13}N_{3}O_{1}
Molar mass	203.24 g/mol
Density	1.207g/cm^{3}
Melting point	106 to 110 °C (223 to 230 °F; 379 to 383 K)
Boiling point	309 °C (588 °F; 582 K) @760mmHg

Hazards
Flash point	140.7 °C (285.3 °F; 413.8 K)
- Except where otherwise noted, data are given for materials in their standard state (at 25 °C [77 °F], 100 kPa). verify (what is ?) Infobox references

Ampyrone is a metabolite of aminopyrine with analgesic, anti-inflammatory, and antipyretic properties. While the parent drug, aminopyrine, has been discouraged due to the risk of agranulocytosis, ampyrone itself has significantly lower toxicity. It is used as a reagent for biochemical reactions producing peroxides or phenols. Ampyrone stimulates liver microsomes and is also used to measure extracellular water.

By applying an ampyrone solution, scientists can make skin temporarily transparent (to red light); and e.g. see directly into the brain (of living young mice, when the skull is very thin, thus transparent, the solution doesn't have such an effect on it): "This opens a literal window to peek into the brain's development .. Not only can we image the structures of these neurons, but we can also image the neural activity over time in an animal model. In the future, this approach could enable us to look at how these circuits form during the development of an animal."
