= Antipyretic =

Substance that reduces fever

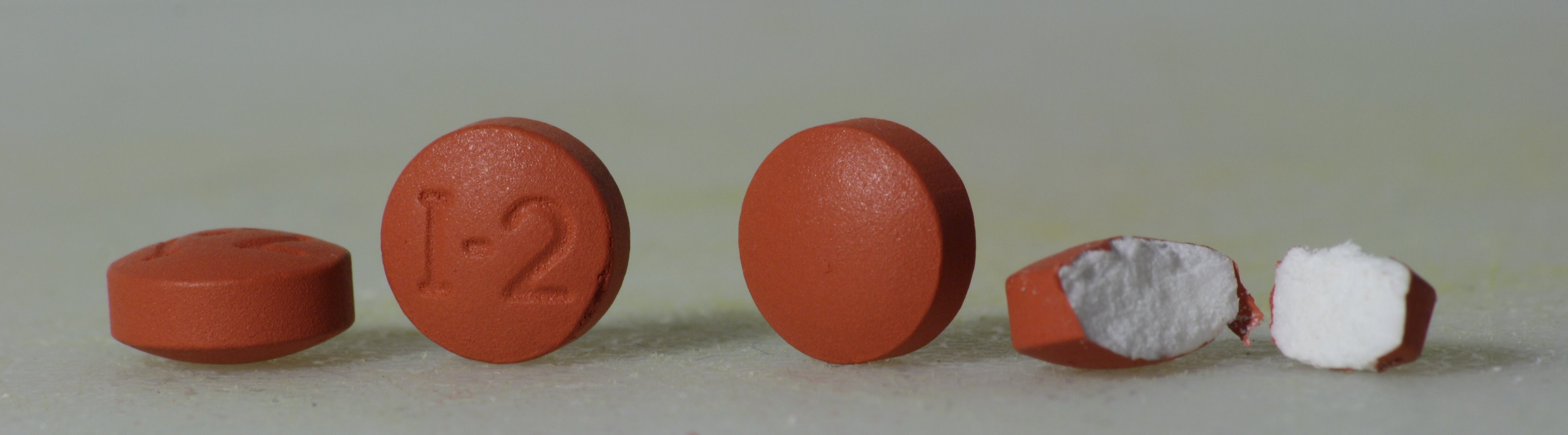
Tablets of ibuprofen, a common antipyretic

An antipyretic (/ˌæntipaɪˈrɛtɪk/, from anti- 'against' and pyretic 'feverish') is a substance that reduces fever. Antipyretics cause the hypothalamus to override a prostaglandin-induced increase in temperature. The body then works to lower the temperature, which results in a reduction in fever.

Most antipyretic medications have other purposes. The most common antipyretics in the US are usually ibuprofen and aspirin, which are nonsteroidal anti-inflammatory drugs (NSAIDs) used primarily as anti-inflammatories and analgesics (pain relievers), but which also have antipyretic properties; and paracetamol (acetaminophen), an analgesic without anti-inflammatory properties.

There is some debate over the appropriate use of such medications, since fever is part of the body's immune response to infection. A study published by the Royal Society claims that fever suppression causes at least 1% more influenza deaths in the United States, or 700 extra deaths per year.

== Non-pharmacological treatment ==
Bathing or sponging with lukewarm or cool water can effectively reduce body temperature in those with heat illness, but not usually in those with fever. The use of alcohol baths is not an appropriate cooling method, because there have been reported adverse events associated with systemic absorption of alcohol.

== Medications ==
The list of medications with antipyretic effects includes many common drugs that also have analgesic and anti-inflammatory activity, several of which are commonly sold over-the-counter (OTC).

- NSAIDs (non-steroidal anti-inflammatory drugs), a broad class of medications that in addition to their defining effect of reducing inflammation, also tend to be potent analgesics and antipyretics. The majority work by inhibiting the activity of the cyclooxygenase (COX) family of enzymes in the body.
  - Nonselective COX enzyme inhibitors like ibuprofen and naproxen.
  - Salicylates, including aspirin (acetylsalicylic acid), magnesium salicylate, and sodium salicylate. These are also primarily nonselective COX inhibitors, but also work through other mechanisms including activating AMP-activated protein kinase.
  - COX inhibitors that are relatively selective for the COX-1 enzyme, such as ketoprofen and flurbiprofen.
  - Conversely, COX inhibitors that are relatively selective for COX-2, including nimesulide, diclofenac and celecoxib.
  - Phenazone-like drugs (pyrazolones), many of which have been largely phased out of used owing to safety concerns in most countries (including metamizole (the "Mexican aspirin"), banned in over 30 countries for causing agranulocytosis), but remain available in some locations or for specific purposes such as for treating otitis media in the form of ear drops.
- Paracetamol (acetaminophen) class antipyretics, which have negligible anti-inflammatory activity. Apart from paracetamol itself, the medications in this class are mainly previously marketed drugs which were withdrawn owing to safety concerns, one example of this being phenacetin.
- A few other medications have antipyretic effects of varying strength. While these medications tend to have too weak fever reducing effects or too many adverse effects to use primarily as antipyretics, their antipyretic effect may occasionally be useful. For example, there are theoretical reasons to believe, as well as slight evidence from one human trial, that α_{2}-adrenergic agonists, and particularly clonidine (a common drug used to treat high blood pressure, ADHD, spasticity and several other conditions), may have antipyretic effects, which if verified could potentially be useful in patients with septic shock or acute respiratory distress syndrome.

=== Use in children ===
The U.S. Food and Drug Administration (FDA) notes that improper dosing is one of the biggest problems in giving acetaminophen (paracetamol) to children. The effectiveness of acetaminophen alone as an antipyretic in children is uncertain, with some evidence showing it is no better than physical methods. Therapies involving alternating doses of acetaminophen and ibuprofen have shown greater antipyretic effect than either drug alone. One meta-analysis indicated that ibuprofen is more effective than acetaminophen in children at similar doses when both are given alone.

Due to concerns about Reye syndrome, it is recommended that aspirin and combination products that contain aspirin not be given to children or teenagers during episodes of fever-causing illnesses.

== Traditional medicine ==
Traditional use of vascular plants with antipyretic properties is a common worldwide feature of many ethnobotanical cultures. In ethnobotany, a plant with naturally occurring antipyretic properties is commonly referred to as a febrifuge.
