= Agranulocytosis =

- Specialty: Hematology, immunology
- Symptoms: Rigors, fever, sore throat, rapid infection
- Complications: Sepsis
- Causes: Idiosyncratic reactions to certain drugs
- Risk factors: Cocaine use
- Diagnostic method: Complete blood count, bone marrow examination
- Differential diagnosis: Aplastic anemia, paroxysmal nocturnal hemoglobinuria, myelodysplasia, leukemia

Agranulocytosis, also known as agranulosis or granulopenia, is an acute condition involving a severe and dangerous lowered white blood cell count (leukopenia, most commonly of neutrophils) and thus causing neutropenia in the circulating blood. It is a severe lack of one major class of infection-fighting white blood cells. People with this condition are at very high risk of serious infections due to their suppressed immune system.

In agranulocytosis, the concentration of granulocytes (a major class of white blood cells that includes neutrophils, basophils, and eosinophils) drops below 200 cells/mm^{3} of blood.

== Signs and symptoms ==
Agranulocytosis may be asymptomatic, or may clinically present with sudden fever, rigors and sore throat. Infection of any organ may be rapidly progressive (e.g., pneumonia, urinary tract infection). Sepsis may also progress rapidly.

== Causes ==
A large number of drugs have been associated with agranulocytosis, including antiepileptics (such as carbamazepine and valproate), antithyroid drugs (carbimazole, thiamazole, and propylthiouracil), antibiotics (penicillin, chloramphenicol and trimethoprim/sulfamethoxazole), H2 blockers (cimetidine, famotidine, nizatidine, ranitidine), ACE inhibitors (benazepril), cytotoxic drugs, gold salts, analgesics (aminophenazone, indomethacin, naproxen, phenylbutazone, metamizole), mebendazole, allopurinol, the antidepressants mianserin and mirtazapine, and some antipsychotics. The atypical antipsychotic clozapine in particular is largely restricted to treatment-resistant cases and mandatory blood count monitoring in most countries.

Although the reaction is generally idiosyncratic rather than proportional, experts recommend that patients using these drugs be told about the symptoms of agranulocytosis-related infection, such as a sore throat and a fever.

The Centers for Disease Control and Prevention traced outbreaks of agranulocytosis among cocaine users, in the US and Canada between March 2008 and November 2009, to the presence of levamisole in the drug supply. The Drug Enforcement Administration reported that, as of February 2010, 71% of seized cocaine lots coming into the US contained levamisole as a cutting agent. Levamisole is an antihelminthic (i.e. deworming) drug used in animals. The reason for adding levamisole to cocaine hydrochloride is unknown, although it is likely due to their similar melting points, solubilities, and appearance.

== Diagnosis ==
The diagnosis is made after a complete blood count, a routine blood test. The absolute neutrophil count in this test will be below 500, and can reach 0 cells/mm^{3}. Other kinds of blood cells are typically present in normal numbers. To formally diagnose agranulocytosis, other pathologies with a similar presentation must be excluded, such as aplastic anemia, paroxysmal nocturnal hemoglobinuria, myelodysplasia and leukemias. This requires a bone marrow examination that shows normocellular (normal amounts and types of cells) blood marrow with underdeveloped promyelocytes. These underdeveloped promyelocytes, if fully matured, would have been the missing granulocytes.

=== Classification ===
The term "agranulocytosis" derives from the Greek: a, meaning without; granulocyte, a particular kind of white blood cell (containing granules in its cytoplasm); and osis, meaning condition [esp. disorder]. Consequently, agranulocytosis is sometimes described as "no granulocytes", but a total absence is not required for diagnosis. However, "-osis" is commonly used in blood disorders to imply cell proliferation (such as in "leukocytosis"), while "-penia" to imply reduced cell numbers (as in "leukopenia"); for these reasons, granulocytopenia is a more etymologically consistent term, and as such, is sometimes preferred to "agranulocytosis" (which can be misinterpreted as "agranulocyt-osis", meaning proliferation of agranulocytes (i.e. lymphocytes and monocytes). Despite this, "agranulocytosis" remains the most widely used term for the condition.

The terms agranulocytosis, granulocytopenia and neutropenia are sometimes used interchangeably. Agranulocytosis implies a more severe deficiency than granulocytopenia. Neutropenia indicates a deficiency of neutrophils (the most common granulocyte cell) only.

To be precise, neutropenia is the term normally used to describe absolute neutrophil counts (ANCs) of less than 500 cells per microlitre, whereas agranulocytosis is reserved for cases with ANCs of less than 100 cells per microlitre.

The following terms can be used to specify the type of granulocyte referenced:

- Inadequate numbers of neutrophils: neutropenia (most common)
- Inadequate numbers of eosinophils: eosinopenia (uncommon)
- Inadequate numbers of basophils: basopenia (very rare)

In a general sense the pathogenesis of neutropenia can be divided into two categories;

- Inadequate or ineffective formation of granulocytes. This can be due to bone marrow failure associated with aplastic anemia, leukemia, or chemotherapeutic agents. There can also be isolated neutropenias where only differentiated granulocyte precursors are affected as in the case of neoplastic proliferation of cytotoxic T cells or NK cells
- Accelerated destruction of neutrophils. Immune-mediated reactions to neutrophils which can be caused by drugs. An enlarged spleen can lead to splenic sequestration and accelerated removal of neutrophils. Utilization of neutrophils can occur in infections

== Treatment ==
In patients that have no symptoms of infection, management consists of close monitoring with serial blood counts, cessation of the offending agent (e.g., medication), and general advice on the significance of fever. Transfusion of granulocytes would be a solution to the problem. However, granulocytes live only ~10 hours in the circulation (for days in spleen or other tissue), which gives a very short-lasting effect. In addition, there are many complications of such a procedure.

== See also ==
- Granulocytosis
