= Friedrich Stolz =

German chemist (1860–1936)

Friedrich Stolz (6 April 1860 – 2 April 1936) was a German chemist and, in 1904, the first person to artificially synthesize epinephrine (adrenaline).
