= Metamizole =

Medication

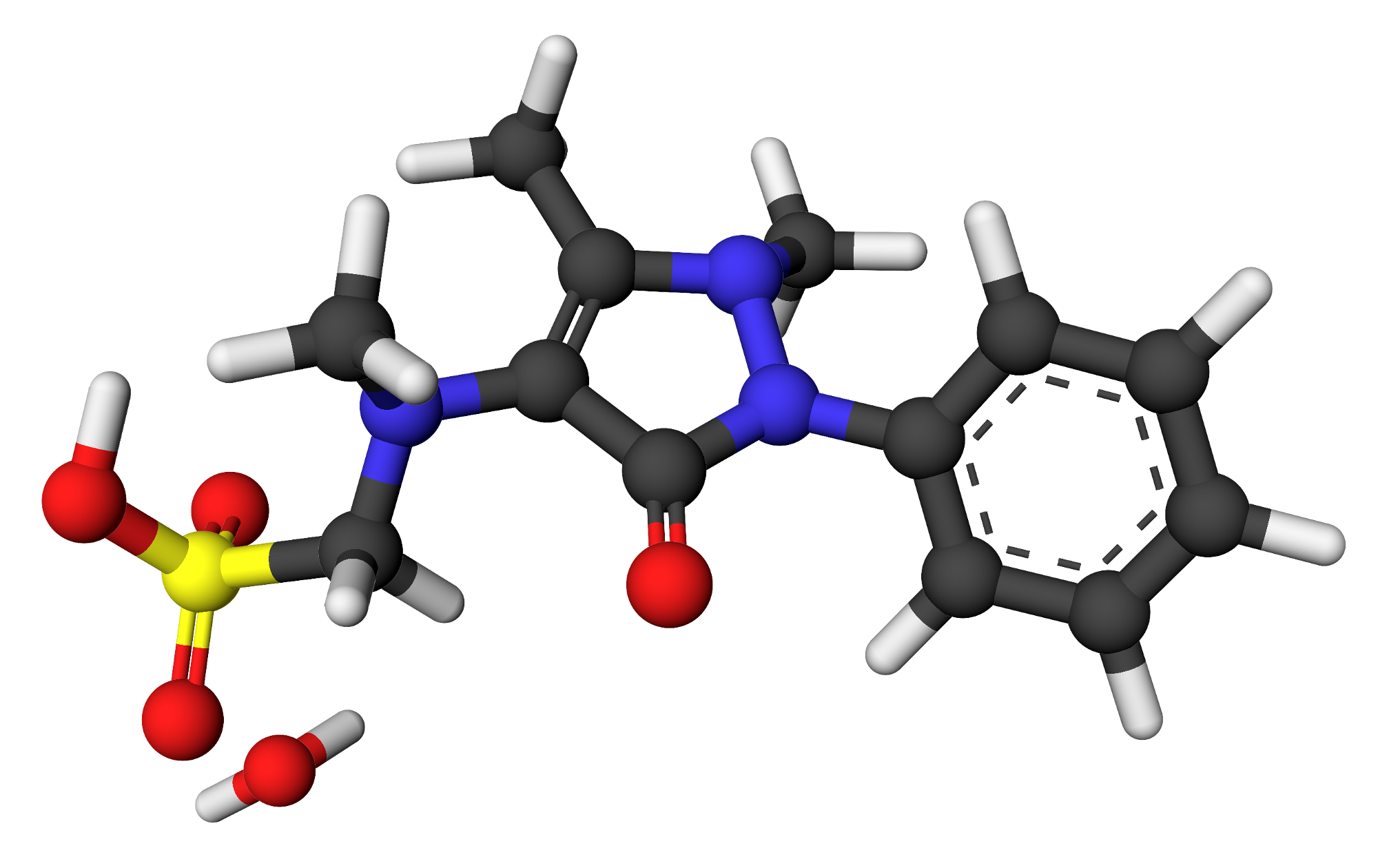

Clinical data
- Trade names: Analgin (India), Neo-Melubrina (Mexico), Nolotil (Spain), Novalgin (Germany), Optalgin (Israel), others
- Other names: Dipyrone (BAN UK, USAN US), Sulpyrine (JAN JP)
- AHFS/Drugs.com: International Drug Names
- Pregnancy category: None assigned; no evidence of teratogenicity in animal studies, but use in the third trimester may cause adverse effects in the newborn or ductus arteriosus (a heart defect) due to its weak NSAID activity.
- Routes of administration: By mouth, intramuscular, intravenous, rectal
- ATC code: N02BB02 (WHO)

Legal status
- Legal status: AU: Withdrawn; BR: OTC (Over the counter); CA: Veterinary only; DE: § 48 AMG/§ 1 MPAV (Prescription only); NZ: Prescription only; UK: Withdrawn; US: Veterinary only (horses); EU: Legally available

Pharmacokinetic data
- Bioavailability: Over 90% (active metabolites)
- Protein binding: 58% (active metabolites)
- Metabolism: Liver
- Elimination half-life: 14 minutes (parent compound; IV route); metabolites: 2–4 h
- Duration of action: 4–6 hours
- Excretion: Urine (96%, IV; 85%, oral), faeces (4%, IV).

Identifiers
- IUPAC name: [(2,3-Dihydro-1,5-dimethyl-3-oxo-2-phenyl-1H-pyrazol-4-yl)methylamino] methanesulfonic acid
- CAS Number: 50567-35-6 68-89-3 (sodium salt)
- PubChem CID: 3111; 522325
- DrugBank: DB04817
- ChemSpider: 3000
- UNII: 934T64RMNJ
- KEGG: D08188
- ChEBI: CHEBI:62088
- ChEMBL: ChEMBL461522
- CompTox Dashboard (EPA): DTXSID8020543
- ECHA InfoCard: 100.000.631

Chemical and physical data
- Formula: C_{13}H_{17}N_{3}O_{4}S
- Molar mass: 311.36 g·mol^{−1}
- 3D model (JSmol): Interactive image
- SMILES: c1ccccc1N2N(C)C(C)=C(C2=O)N(C)CS(=O)(=O)O
- InChI: InChI=1S/C13H17N3O4S/c1-10-12(14(2)9-21(18,19)20)13(17)16(15(10)3)11-7-5-4-6-8-11/h4-8H,9H2,1-3H3,(H,18,19,20); Key:LVWZTYCIRDMTEY-UHFFFAOYSA-N

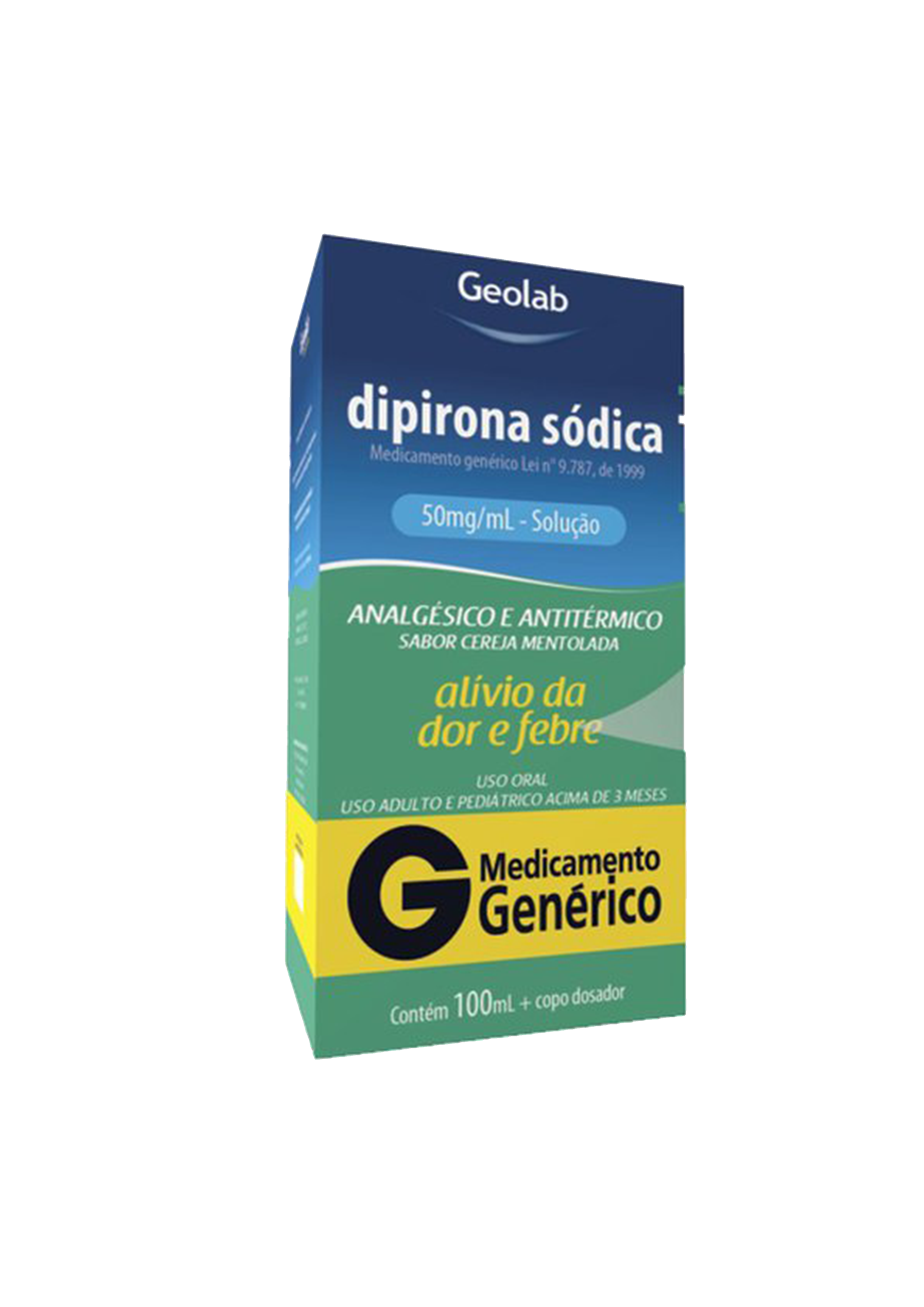
Generic metamizole sodium (oral solution) as marketed in Brazil

Metamizole or dipyrone is an analgesic, antispasmodic, and antipyretic drug. It is most commonly given by mouth or by intravenous infusion. It belongs to the ampyrone sulfonate family of medicines and was patented in 1922. Metamizole is marketed under various trade names. It was first used medically in Germany under the brand name Novalgin, later becoming widely known in Slavic nations and India under the brand name Analgin.

The sale of metamizole is restricted in some jurisdictions following studies in the 1970s that associated it with severe adverse effects, including agranulocytosis. Metamizole nonethless remains popular in many countries, where it is typically available as an over-the-counter medication.

In the United States, metamizole is known colloquially as "Mexican aspirin".

== Medical uses ==
Metamizole, with its analgesic (pain relief), antipyretic (fever reduction), and spasmolytic (relax muscle contractions) properties, is utilized in the management of acute pain, fever, and pain caused by muscle spasms.

Metamizole is primarily used for perioperative pain, acute injury, colic, cancer pain, other acute/chronic forms of pain and high fever unresponsive to other agents. Metamizole also effectively manages biliary and intestinal colic-like pain, and reduces the spasm of the smooth muscle of the sphincter of Oddi.

=== Special populations ===
Its use in pregnancy is advised against, although animal studies are reassuring in that they show minimal risk of birth defects. Its use in the elderly and those with liver or kidney impairment is advised against, but if these groups of people must be treated, a lower dose and caution is usually advised. Its use during lactation is advised against, as it is excreted in breast milk.

== Adverse effects ==
While metamizole is a relatively safe medication, it is not entirely devoid of adverse effects. A 2024 review article found that metamizole had a lower risk of causing mild adverse effects than aspirin and paracetamol.

Metamizole has a potential of blood-related toxicity (blood dyscrasias), but causes less kidney, cardiovascular, and gastrointestinal toxicity than non-steroidal anti-inflammatory drugs (NSAIDs). Like NSAIDs, it can trigger bronchospasm or anaphylaxis, especially in those with asthma.

Serious side effects include agranulocytosis, aplastic anaemia, hypersensitivity reactions (e.g., anaphylaxis and bronchospasm), toxic epidermal necrolysis, and it may provoke acute attacks of porphyria, as it is chemically related to the sulfonamides. The relative risk for agranulocytosis appears to greatly vary according to the country of estimates on said rate and opinion on the risk is strongly divided. Genetics may influence metamizole sensitivity. It is suggested that some populations are more prone to suffer from metamizole induced agranulocytosis than others. As an example, metamizole-related agranulocytosis seems to be an adverse effect more frequent in British population as opposed to Spaniards. An assessment report by the European Medicines Agency remarked that "the potential to induce agranulocytosis may be associated with genetic characteristics of the population studied".

A 2015 meta-analysis concluded that on the evidence available "for short-term use in the hospital setting, metamizole seems to be a safe choice when compared to other widely used analgesics", but that the "results were limited by the mediocre overall quality of the reports" analysed.

A systematic review from 2016 found that metamizole significantly increased the relative risk of upper gastrointestinal bleeding, by a factor of 1.4–2.7 times; however, none of the studies included in that review accounted for duration of therapy or dose. A study by one of the manufacturers of the drug found the risk of agranulocytosis within the first week of treatment to be a 1.1 in a million, versus 5.9 in a million for diclofenac. Therapeutic effect of metamizole on intestinal colic is attributed to its analgesic properties, with no evidence of interference in small bowel or colon motility.

Metamizole has potential for hepatotoxicity.

=== Contraindications ===
Previous hypersensitivity (e.g., agranulocytosis or anaphylaxis) to metamizole or any of the excipients (e.g., lactose) in the preparation used, acute porphyria, impaired hematopoiesis (such as due to treatment with chemotherapy agents), third trimester of pregnancy (potential for adverse effects in the newborn), lactation, children with a body weight below 16 kg, history of aspirin-induced asthma and other hypersensitivity reactions to analgesics.

In 2018, the European Medicines Agency (EMA) reviewed the safety of metamizole and concluded it to be generally safe for the general population. However, they advised against its use in the third trimester of pregnancy or while breastfeeding due to risks of renal impairment or ductus arteriosus to the fetus or infant.

== Interactions ==
A clinically severe interaction has been identified between aspirin and metamizole for patients who regularly take aspirin to manage vascular disease: this interaction occurs due to steric hindrance at the active aspirin binding site of COX-1 by metamizole; to manage this interaction, it is recommended to make a delay between the intake of each of these drugs, with aspirin being taken at least 30 minutes before metamizole.

Known interactions
Drug(s)	Interaction/reason for theoretical potential for interaction
Aspirin	Platelet aggregation inhibition (PAI) by aspirin; metamizole prevents aspirin from inhibiting COX-1.
Ciclosporin	Decreased serum levels of ciclosporin.
Chlorpromazine	Additive hypothermia (low body temperature) may result.
Hydroxyethyl starch	Acute renal insufficiency. Low evidence, but discouraged simultaneous administration.
Methotrexate	Additive risk for haematologic (blood) toxicity. More specifically, bone marrow aplasia.

Oral anticoagulants (blood thinners), lithium, captopril, triamterene and antihypertensives may also interact with metamizole, as other pyrazolones are known to interact adversely with these substances.

=== Overdose ===
Metamizole is fairly safe on overdose, but in these cases supportive measures are usually advised as well as measures to limit absorption (e.g., activated charcoal) and accelerate excretion (e.g., hemodialysis).

== Pharmacology ==
The precise mechanism of action of metamizole is unknown, although metamizole appears to exert its action mainly by inhibiting the COX-3 enzyme which is responsible for the biosynthesis of prostaglandins in the central nervous system (CNS)—in the brain and spinal cord. Prostaglandins are lipid compounds that play a role in inflammation, pain, and fever. By inhibiting the COX-3 enzyme in the CNS, metamizole reduces the production of prostaglandins, thereby alleviating pain, reducing fever, and potentially lessening inflammation. Activation of the endocannabinoid and opioidergic systems is also thought to play a role in analgesic effects of metamizole. Metamizole is classified as an atypical nonsteroidal anti-inflammatory drug (NSAID). Unlike typical NSAIDs, metamizole lacks anti-inflammatory properties in therapeutic dosage, but possesses potent analgesic effects via its action in the CNS: this central action distinguishes it from other NSAIDs, which generally exert their effects peripherally. The inhibition of COX-1 and COX-2 by metamizole is less potent than the inhibition of these enzymes by traditional NSAIDs.

Metamizole is metabolized in the liver, where it is converted into active metabolites through the process of N-demethylation. The mechanism of action of metamizole is believed to be exerted via its active metabolites, specifically, arachidonoyl-4-methylaminoantipyrine (ARA-4-MAA) and arachidonoyl-4-aminoantipyrine (ARA-4-AA). This mechanism of action has been compared to paracetamol and its active arachidonic acid metabolite AM404. The CB_{1} receptor inverse agonist AM-251 was able to reduce the cataleptic response and thermal analgesia of metamizole. Another study found its antihyperalgesic effect reversed by the CB_{2} inverse agonist AM-630. Although it seems to inhibit fevers caused by prostaglandins, especially prostaglandin E_{2}, metamizole appears to produce its therapeutic effects by means of its metabolites, especially N-methyl-4-aminoantipyrine (MAA) and 4-aminoantipyrine (AA) which form through the FAAH enzyme to create arachidonoyl-4-methylaminoantipyrine (ARA-4-MAA) and arachidonoyl-4-aminoantipyrine (ARA-4-AA).

Metamizole likely induces the CYP2B6 and CYP3A4 enzymes.

Pharmacokinetics of metamizole's major metabolites
Metabolite	Acronym	Biologically active?	Pharmacokinetic properties
N-methyl-4-aminoantipyrine	MAA	Yes	Bioavailability≈90%. Plasma protein binding: 58%. Excreted in the urine as 3±1% of the initial (oral) dose
4-aminoantipyrine	AA	Yes	Bioavailability≈22.5%. Plasma protein binding: 48%. Excreted in the urine as 6±3% of the initial (oral) dose
N-formyl-4-aminoantipyrine	FAA	No	Plasma protein binding: 18%. Excretion in the urine as 23±4% of the initial oral dose
N-acetyl-4-aminoantipyrine	AAA	No	Plasma protein binding: 14%. Excretion in the urine as 26±8% of the initial oral dose

== Chemistry ==
Metamizole is a sulfonic acid and comes in calcium, sodium, and magnesium salt forms. Its sodium salt monohydrate form is a white/almost crystalline powder that is unstable in the presence of light, highly soluble in water and ethanol but practically insoluble in dichloromethane.

== History ==
Ludwig Knorr was a student of Emil Fischer, who won the Nobel Prize for his work on purines and sugars, which included the discovery of phenylhydrazine. In the 1880s, Knorr was trying to make quinine derivatives from phenylhydrazine, and instead made a pyrazole derivative, which after a methylation, he made into phenazone, also called antipyrine, which has been called "the 'mother' of all modern antipyretic analgesics." Sales of that drug exploded, and in the 1890s chemists at Teerfarbenfabrik Meister, Lucius & Co. (a precursor of Hoechst AG which is now Sanofi), made another derivative called pyramidon which was three times more active than antipyrine.

In 1893, a derivative of antipyrine, aminopyrine, was made by Friedrich Stolz at Hoechst. Yet later, chemists at Hoechst made a derivative, melubrine (sodium antipyrine aminomethanesulfonate), which was introduced in 1913; finally in 1920, metamizole was synthesized. Metamizole is a methyl derivative of melubrine and is also a more soluble prodrug of pyramidon. Metamizole was first marketed in Germany as "Novalgin" in 1922.

== Society and culture ==
=== Legal status ===
World map of availability of Metamizole (Dipyrone) Over-the-counter with limited restrictions. Available, but no data on the requirement of prescriptions. Prescription-only, with fairly limited restrictions on its use. Prescription-only, with extensive restrictions on its use. Banned for human use. Metamizole may still be used in veterinary cases in some countries. No data.

Metamizole is banned in several countries, available by prescription in others (sometimes with strong warnings, sometimes without), and available over the counter in yet others. For example, approval was withdrawn in Sweden (1974), the US (1977), and India (2013, ban lifted in 2014).

Although metamizole is banned in the US because of its risk of agranulocytosis, it was reported by small surveys that 28% of Hispanics in Miami have possession of it, and 38% of Hispanics in San Diego reported some usage.

There were unauthorized sales and use of metamizole in horses in the US. After reviewing trial data on its safety, the FDA approved it for treating fever in equines.

Amid the opioid crisis, a study pointed out that the legal status of metamizole has a relation to the consumption of oxycodone, showing the use of those drugs were inversely correlated. Its use could be beneficial when adjusted for the addictive risk of opioids, especially on limited and controlled use of metamizole. A 2019 Israeli conference also justified the approved status as a preventive to opioid dependence, and metamizole being safer than most analgesics for renally-impaired patients.

Metamizole is the most sold medication in São Paulo, Brazil, accounting for 488 tons in 2016. Given this contrasting consumption compared to other countries, the Brazilian Health Regulatory Agency convened an international panel for evaluating its safety in 2001, and the conclusion was that the benefits substantially outweighed the risks, and imposing restrictions would lead to significant negative consequences to the population. It is also highly popular in Latin America overall. In 2022 in Brazil alone over 215 million doses were administered.

The Bulgarian pharmaceutical Sopharma produces it under the brand Analgin, which as of 2014, has been the top-selling analgesic in Bulgaria for over a decade.

In Germany, the drug is the most commonly prescribed pain reliever.

In 2012, headache accounts for 70% of its use in Indonesia.

In 2018, investigators in Spain looked into Nolotil (as metamizole is marketed in Spain) after the death of several British people in Spain. A possible factor in these deaths might have been a side effect of metamizole that can cause agranulocytosis (a lowering of white blood cell count).

=== Brand names ===
Metamizole is the international nonproprietary name, and in countries where it is marketed, it is available under many brand names.

In Romania metamizole is available as the original marketed pharmaceutical product by Zentiva as Algocalmin, as 500 mg immediate release tablets. It's also available as an injection with 1 g of metamizole sodium dissolved in 2 ml of solvent.

In Israel it is sold under the brand name "Optalgin" (Hebrew: אופטלגין), manufactured by Teva.

Metamizole is known as Sulpyrin and Sulpyrine in South Korea (설피린) and Japan. (スルピリン)

In Brazil, it is popularly known as "dipirona". It can be found under the brand names Novalgina, Dorflex, Neosaldina, Lisador Dip, Benegrip, among others. No prescription is required for consumption.

==== Analgin ====
Analgin (Russian: Анальгин) is a generic name used in the former USSR pharmacopeia, continuing in use in Slavic nations. A firm in Russia tried unsuccessfully in 2011 to claim the name as their trademark. In Bulgaria, Sopharma succeeded in registering Analgin as a trademark in 2004.

Analgin is also the common term used in the Indian pharmacopeia.

== See also ==
- Phenylbutazone
- Propyphenazone
