= Aminophenazone =

Non-narcotic analgesic drug

Aminophenazone INN: aminophenazone
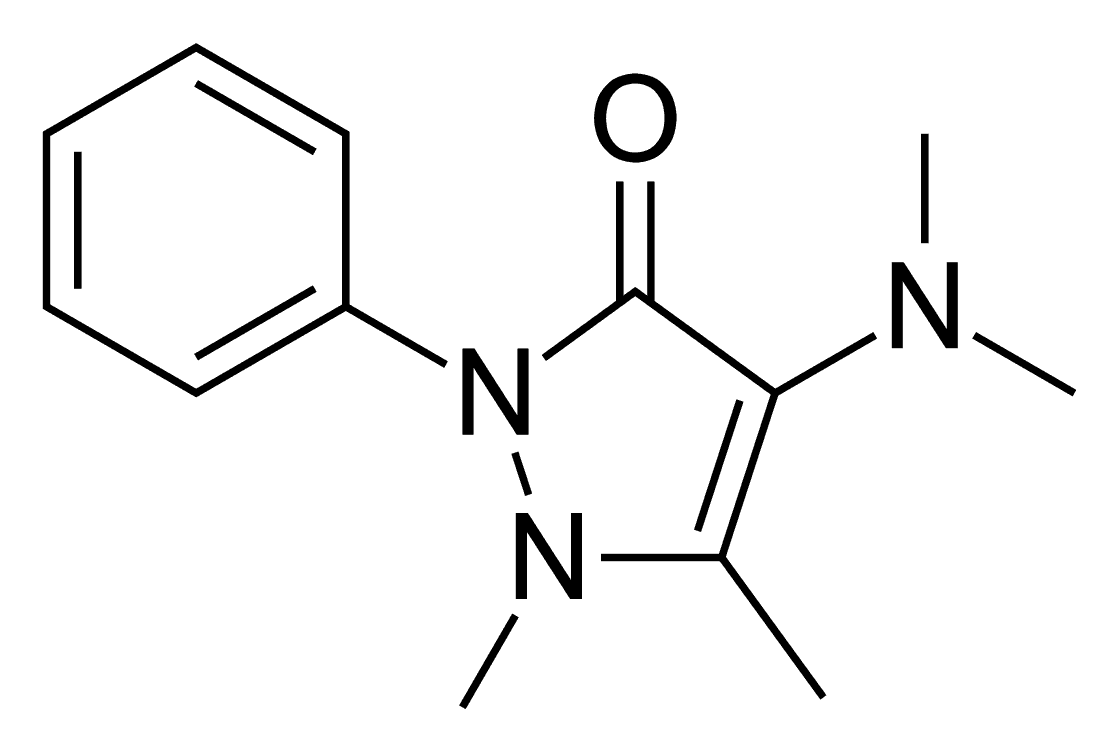

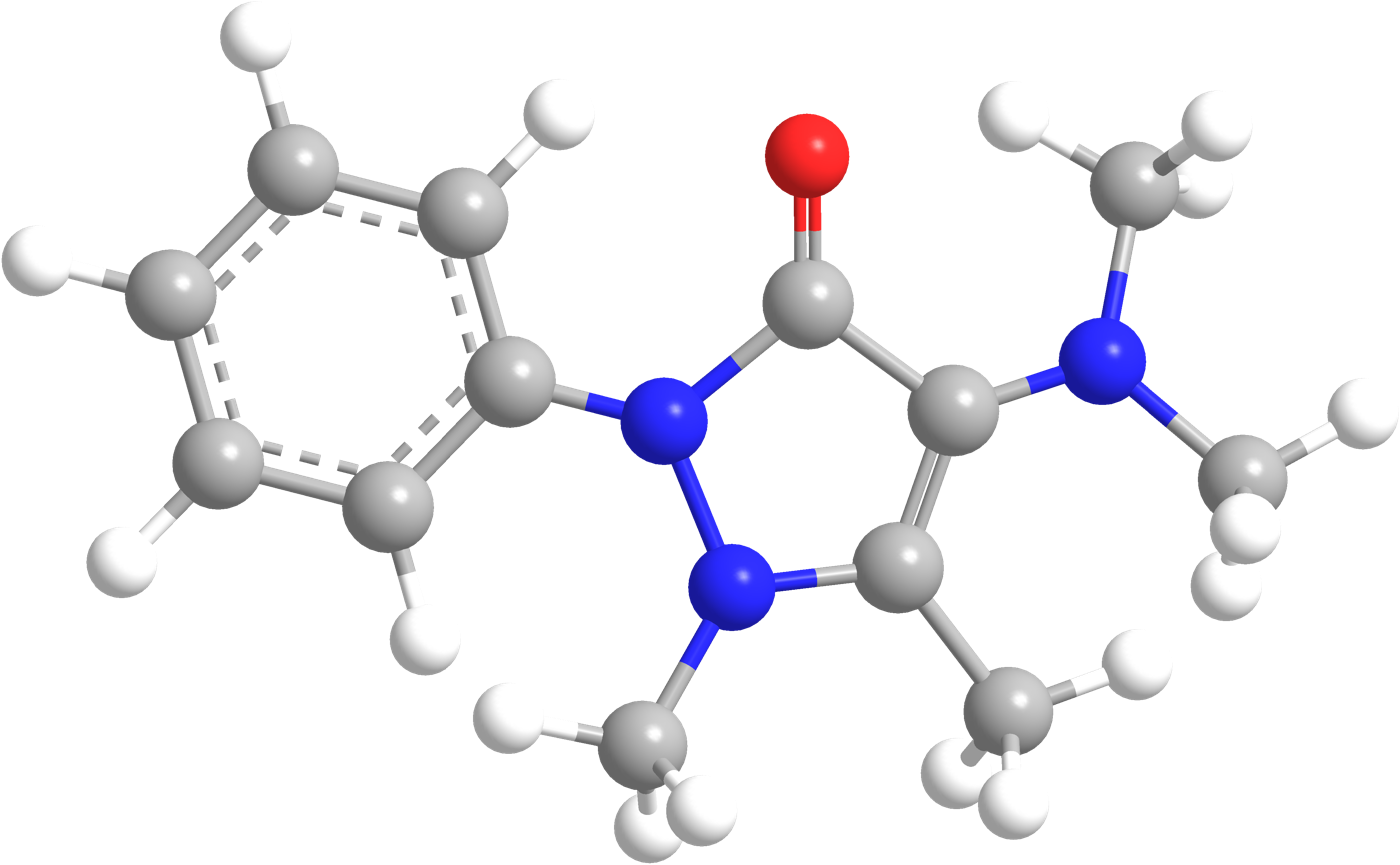

Clinical data
- AHFS/Drugs.com: International Drug Names
- ATC code: N02BB03 (WHO)

Pharmacokinetic data
- Metabolism: N-demethylation

Identifiers
- IUPAC name: 4-Dimethylamino-1,5-dimethyl-2-phenylpyrazol-3-one
- CAS Number: 58-15-1
- PubChem CID: 6009
- DrugBank: DB01424
- ChemSpider: 5787
- UNII: 01704YP3MO
- KEGG: D00556
- ChEBI: CHEBI:160246
- ChEMBL: ChEMBL288470
- CompTox Dashboard (EPA): DTXSID7020504
- ECHA InfoCard: 100.000.332

Chemical and physical data
- Formula: C_{13}H_{17}N_{3}O
- Molar mass: 231.299 g·mol^{−1}
- 3D model (JSmol): Interactive image
- SMILES: O=C2\C(=C(/N(N2c1ccccc1)C)C)N(C)C
- InChI: InChI=1S/C13H17N3O/c1-10-12(14(2)3)13(17)16(15(10)4)11-8-6-5-7-9-11/h5-9H,1-4H3; Key:RMMXTBMQSGEXHJ-UHFFFAOYSA-N

Aminophenazone (or aminopyrine, amidopyrine, Pyramidon) is a non-narcotic analgesic substance. It is a pyrazolone and a derivative of phenazone, which also has anti-inflammatory and antipyretic properties. While inexpensive and effective, especially in the treatment of rheumatism, the drug carries a serious risk of severe and sometimes fatal side-effects, including agranulocytosis. While its production and use have been banned in many countries, including France, Thailand, India, Japan and USA, it is still sometimes used in the developing world.

A breath test with ^{13}C-labeled aminopyrine has been used as a non-invasive measure of cytochrome P-450 metabolic activity in liver-function tests. It is also used in measuring the total body water in the human body system.

== History ==
Aminophenazone was first synthesized by Friedrich Stolz and Ludwig Knorr in the late nineteenth century, and sold as an anti-fever medicine known as Pyramidon by Hoechst AG from 1897 until its eventual replacement in the late 1970s by the safer propyphenazone molecule.

== Symptoms ==
Symptoms of exposure to this compound include:

- allergic reactions
- strong spasmolytic effect on smooth muscle of peripheral blood vessels
- irritability
- palsy
- copious sweating
- dilated pupils
- sharp drop then rise in body temperature
- dysuria
- dyspnea
- anxiety
- rectal tenesmus
- urinary frequency
- intermittent fever
- fatty infiltration of the liver
- heart muscle degeneration
- death due to circulatory failure following cardiovascular collapse

Agranulocytosis often occurs. Ingestion may cause central nervous system stimulation, vomiting, convulsions, cyanosis, tinnitus, leukopenia, kidney damage and coma. Ingestion may also lead to nausea, mental disturbances, methemoglobinemia, chocolate-colored blood, dizziness, epigastric pain, difficulty in hearing, thready pulse and liver damage.

Other symptoms reported via ingestion include hemolytic anemia, porphyria and severe gastrointestinal bleeding. Bone marrow depression also occurs. Rare eye effects include acute transient myopia.

Chronic symptoms include:

- anorexia
- edema
- oliguria
- urticaria
- hypersensitivity
- aplastic anemia
- sore throat
- fever
- pharyngeal membrane
- jaundice enlargement of the liver and spleen
- exfoliative dermatitis
- gastric or duodenal erosion with perforation or bleeding
- adrenal necrosis
- thrombocytopenic purpura
- acute leukemia

When heated to decomposition this compound emits toxic fumes of nitrogen oxides.

== Metabolism ==
Amidopyrine is metabolized by demethylation and acetylation. Amidopirina metabolites are 4-aminoantipyrine, metilaminoantipirin, rubazonovaya and metilrubazonovaya acid. These acids have a reddish color. At high amidopirine doses, urine can have a reddish brown coloration, due to the presence in the urine of these acid markers.

== Drug Interactions ==
When aminophenazone is combined with other medications, severe side effects, including fatal ones, may occur. Aminophenazone may reduce the effect of other tablet medications

aminophenazone may interact with a wide range of tablet medications. Among them, the following stand out in the table below.

Drug	Side effect
Abrocitinib	The metabolism of Abrocitinib can be decreased when combined with Aminophenazone.
Acamprosate	The excretion of Acamprosate can be decreased when combined with Aminophenazone.
Acebutolol	Aminophenazone may decrease the antihypertensive activities of Acebutolol.
Aceclofenac	The risk or severity of adverse effects can be increased when Aminophenazone is combined with Aceclofenac.

== In popular culture ==
Hospital Universitario Ramón y Cajal in Madrid, Spain was built as a center for specialized surgery, a panacea for the ills of the health system in Madrid. Locals hence nicknamed it el piramidón.
