= List of drugs: Pro–Prz =

This multi-page article lists pharmaceutical drugs alphabetically by name. Many drugs have more than one name and, therefore, the same drug may be listed more than once. Brand names and generic names are differentiated by capitalizing brand names.

See also the list of the top 100 bestselling branded drugs, ranked by sales.

Abbreviations are used in the list as follows:

- INN = International nonproprietary name
- BAN = British Approved Name
- USAN = United States Adopted Name
- Two-letter codes for countries

Lists of drugs
1–9 | A | B | C | D | E | F | G | H | I | J | K | L | M | N | O | P | Q | R | S | T | U | V | W | X | Y | Z

Pa | Pb–Pe | Pf–Ph | Pi | Pj–Pra | Prb–Prn | Pro–Prz | Ps–Pz

== pro ==
- Pro-Banthine

=== proa-prob ===
- proadifen (INN)
- Proamatine
- Probalan
- Probampacin
- probarbital sodium (INN)
- Proben-C
- probenecid (INN)
- probucol (INN)

=== proc-prod ===
- procainamide (INN)
- procaine (INN)
- Procalamine
- Procanbid
- Procapan
- procarbazine (INN)
- Procardia
- procaterol (INN)
- prochlorperazine (INN)
- procinolol (INN)
- procinonide (INN)
- proclonol (INN)
- procodazole (INN)
- Proctocort
- Proctofoam HC
- procyclidine (INN)
- procymate (INN)
- prodeconium bromide (INN)
- prodilidine (INN)
- prodipine (INN)
- prodolic acid (INN)

=== prof-prok ===
- profadol (INN)
- Profen
- Profenal
- profenamine (INN)
- Proferdex
- profexalone (INN)
- proflavine (INN)
- proflazepam (INN)
- Profloxin (Hexal Australia) [Au]. Redirects to ciprofloxacin.
- progabide (INN)
- Progestasert
- progesterone (INN)
- proglumetacin (INN)
- proglumide (INN)
- Proglycem
- Prograf
- proguanil (INN)
- proguanil hydrochloride (USAN)
- Prohance
- proheptazine (INN)
- Proketazine
- Prokine (Immunex Corp)
- Proklar

=== prol-pron ===
- Proleukin
- Prolia
- proligestone (INN)
- proline (INN)
- prolintane (INN)
- Prolixin
- Proloid
- prolonium iodide (INN)
- Proloprim
- Promacta
- Promapar
- promazine (INN)
- promegestone (INN)
- promelase (INN)
- promestriene (INN)
- Prometh
- Promethacon
- promethazine teoclate (INN)
- promethazine (INN)
- Promethegan
- Prometrium
- promolate (INN)
- promoxolane (INN)
- Pronestyl
- pronetalol (INN)

=== prop ===
==== propa-proph ====
- Propacet 100
- propacetamol (INN)
- propafenone (INN)
- propagermanium pumaprazole (INN)
- propamidine (INN)
- propanocaine (INN)
- propantheline bromide (INN)
- propatylnitrate (INN)
- propazolamide (INN)
- Propecia
- propenidazole (INN)
- propentofylline (INN)
- properidine (INN)
- propetamide (INN)
- propetandrol (INN)
- Prophene 65

==== propi-propu ====
- propicillin (INN)
- propikacin (INN)
- Propine
- propinetidine (INN)
- propiolactone (INN)
- propiomazine (INN)
- propipocaine (INN)
- propiram (INN)
- propisergide (INN)
- propiverine (INN)
- propizepine (INN)
- propofol (INN)
- propoxate (INN)
- propoxycaine (INN)
- Propoxyphene Compound 65
- propranolol (INN)
- Propulsid

==== propy ====
- propyl docetrizoate (INN)
- propylhexedrine (INN)
- propyliodone (INN)
- propylthiouracil (INN)
- propyperone (INN)
- propyphenazone (INN)
- propyromazine bromide (INN)

=== proq-pros ===
- proquazone (INN)
- proquinolate (INN)
- prorenoate potassium (INN)
- proroxan (INN)
- Proscar
- proscillaridin (INN)
- Prosol
- Prosom
- prospidium chloride (INN)
- prostalene (INN)
- Prostaphlin
- Prostascint
- Prostep
- Prostin E2
- Prostin F2 Alpha
- Prostin VR Pediatric
- prosulpride (INN)
- prosultiamine (INN)

=== prot-prov ===
- protamine zinc insulin injection (INN)
- proterguride (INN)
- protheobromine (INN)
- prothipendyl (INN)
- prothixene (INN)
- protiofate (INN)
- protionamide (INN)
- protirelin (INN)
- protizinic acid (INN)
- protokylol (INN)
- Protonix
- Protopam Chloride
- Protopic
- Protostat
- protriptyline (INN)
- Protropin
- Proval #3
- Provenge
- Proventil
- Provera
- Provigil
- Provocholine

=== prox-proz ===
- proxazole (INN)
- proxibarbal (INN)
- proxibutene (INN)
- proxicromil (INN)
- proxifezone (INN)
- proxorphan (INN)
- proxymetacaine (INN)
- proxyphylline (INN)
- Prozac
- prozapine (INN)

== pru ==
- prucalopride (INN)
- prulifloxacin (INN)
- prussian blue insoluble (USAN)
- pruvanserin (USAN)
