= Subtilopeptidase A =

Subtilopeptidase A may refer to:

- Subtilisin, EC 3.4.21.62
- Oryzin, EC 3.4.21.63
- Proteinase K, EC 3.4.21.64
- Thermomycolin, EC 3.4.21.65
- Thermitase, EC 3.4.21.66
- Endopeptidase So, EC 3.4.21.67
