= C23H28N2O4 =

The molecular formula C_{23}H_{28}N_{2}O_{4} may refer to:

- Pacrinolol, a beta adrenergic receptor antagonist
- Pleiocarpine, an anticholinergic alkaloid
