= C14H16N2O3 =

The molecular formula C_{14}H_{16}N_{2}O_{3} (molar mass: 260.29 g/mol, exact mass: 260.1161 u) may refer to:

- Nadoxolol
- Phetharbital, or phenetharbital
