= C16H26N2O4 =

The molecular formula C_{16}H_{26}N_{2}O_{4} (molar mass: 310.39 g/mol, exact mass: 310.1893 u) may refer to:

- Cetamolol
- Pamatolol
