= Xia Yu =

Xia Yu may refer to:

- Yu the Great, also known as Xia Yu, legendary founder of the Xia dynasty
- Xia Yu (actor) (born 1978), Chinese actor
- Ha Yu (actor) (born 1946), or Xia Yu, Hong Kong actor
- Birth name of Michelle Xia (born 1966/1967), Chinese billionaire
