= C15H23NO =

The molecular formula C_{15}H_{23}NO (molar mass: 233.34 g/mol, exact mass: 233.1780 u) may refer to:

- Faxeladol
- 3-MeO-PCE, or 3-Methoxyeticyclidine
- Meptazinol
