= C16H19N3O3 =

The molecular formula C_{16}H_{19}N_{3}O_{3} (molar mass: 301.34 g/mol, exact mass: 301.1426 u) may refer to:

- Febrifugine
- HIOC
- Prazitone (AGN-511)
