= C-8813 =

Chemical compound

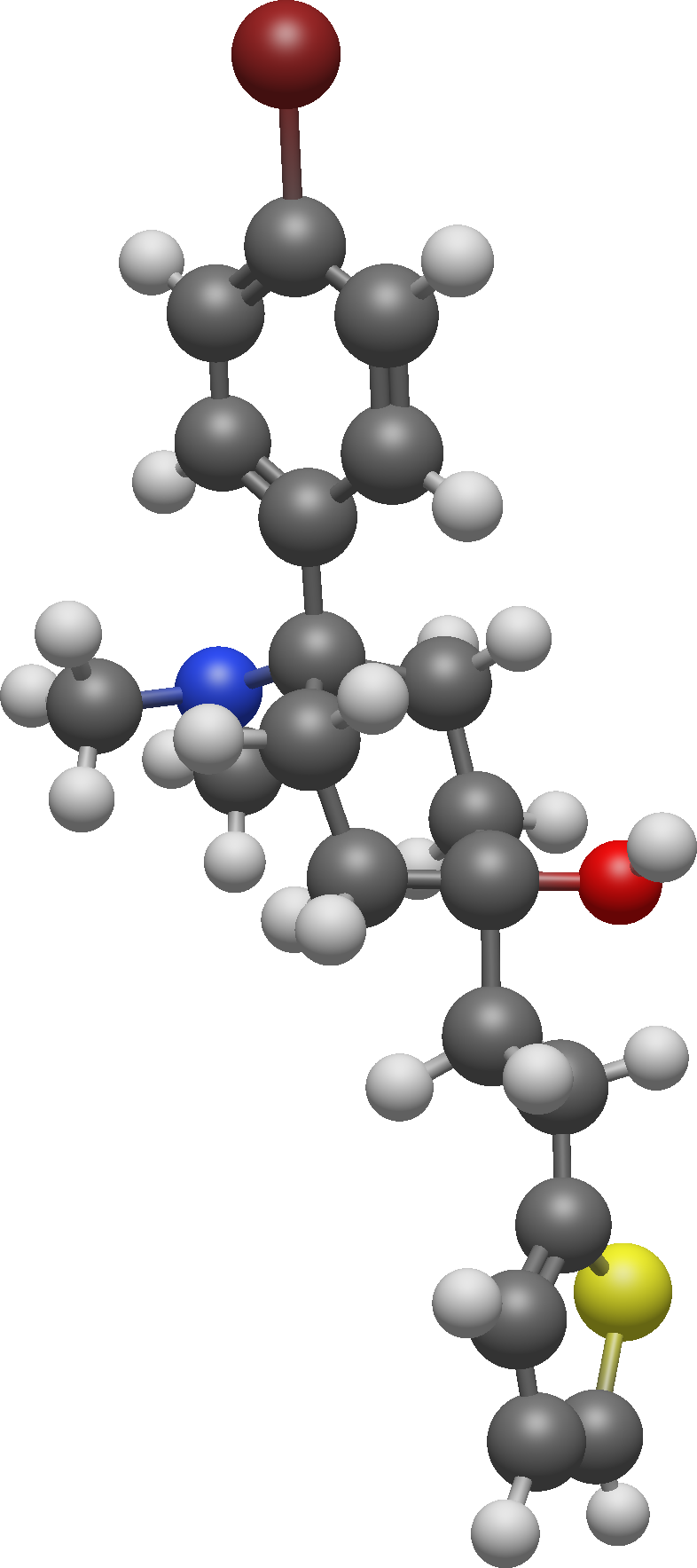

Identifiers
- IUPAC name: trans-4-(p-Bromophenyl)-4-(dimethylamino)-1-(2-(thiophen-2-yl)ethyl)cyclohexanol
- CAS Number: 616898-54-5
- PubChem CID: 11058633
- ChemSpider: 48059007
- UNII: D343S4VX5G

Chemical and physical data
- Formula: C_{20}H_{26}BrNOS
- Molar mass: 408.40 g·mol^{−1}
- 3D model (JSmol): Interactive image
- SMILES: BrC1=CC=C([C@@]2(CC[C@](CC2)(CCC3=CC=CS3)O)N(C)C)C=C1
- InChI: InChI=1S/C20H26BrNOS/c1-22(2)20(16-5-7-17(21)8-6-16)13-11-19(23,12-14-20)10-9-18-4-3-15-24-18/h3-8,15,23H,9-14H2,1-2H3/t19-,20-; Key:XRDNIYBVNZLPJE-MXVIHJGJSA-N

C-8813 (thiobromadol) is a potent μ-opioid receptor agonist with a distinctive chemical structure which is not closely related to other established families of opioid drugs. The trans-isomer was found to be around 591 times more potent than morphine in animal studies. The same study assigned a potency of 504 times that of morphine to the related compound BDPC.

C-8813 is claimed to be similarly potent at the δ-opioid receptor, which antagonizes the μ-induced depression of breathing, presumably making the drug safer.

C-8813 has never been approved for use in humans.

== See also ==
- BDPC
- Ciramadol
- Faxeladol
- Profadol
- Tapentadol
- Tramadol
