= BDPC =

Synthetic opioid

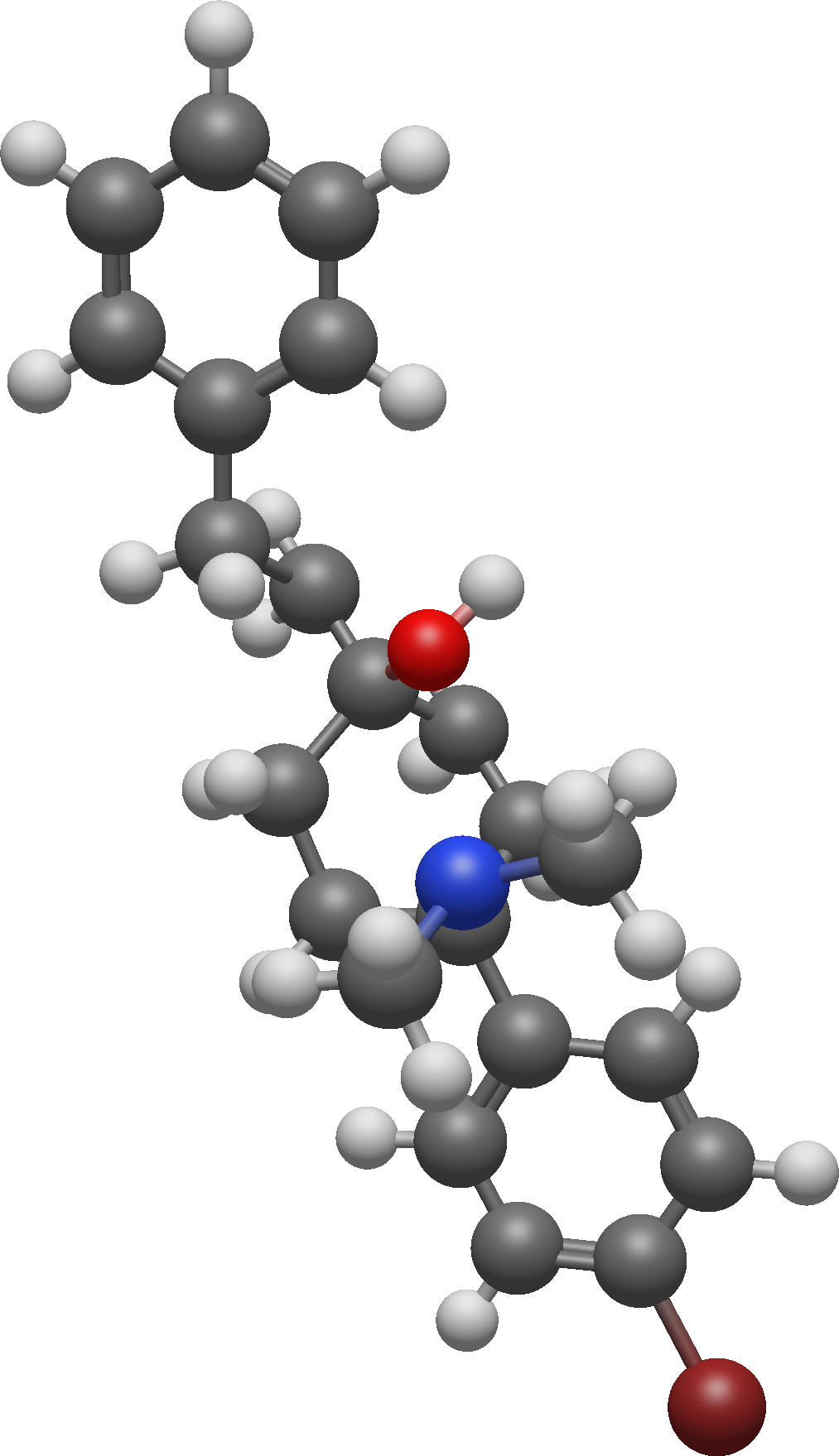

Clinical data
- ATC code: None

Identifiers
- IUPAC name: 4-(4-Bromophenyl)-4-(dimethylamino)-1-(2-phenylethyl)cyclohexan-1-ol
- CAS Number: 77239-98-6 70895-01-1 (HCl)
- PubChem CID: 9887338
- ChemSpider: 8063011
- UNII: G8HCJ9R4VZ
- ChEMBL: ChEMBL3303774

Chemical and physical data
- Formula: C_{22}H_{28}BrNO
- Molar mass: 402.376 g·mol^{−1}
- 3D model (JSmol): Interactive image
- Melting point: 208 to 210 °C (406 to 410 °F)
- SMILES: CN(C)C1(CCC(CC1)(CCC2=CC=CC=C2)O)C3=CC=C(C=C3)Br
- InChI: InChI=1S/C22H28BrNO/c1-24(2)22(19-8-10-20(23)11-9-19)16-14-21(25,15-17-22)13-12-18-6-4-3-5-7-18/h3-11,25H,12-17H2,1-2H3; Key:PRSUTWWKYIVBEU-UHFFFAOYSA-N

BDPC (systematic name 4-(4-bromophenyl)-4-(dimethylamino)-1-(2-phenylethyl)cyclohexanol; also known as bromadol) is a potent fully synthetic opioid with a distinctive arylcyclohexylamine chemical structure. It was developed by Daniel Lednicer at Upjohn in the 1970s. Initial studies estimated that it was around 10,000 times the potency of morphine in animal models. However, later studies using more modern techniques assigned a value of 504 times the potency of morphine for the more active trans-isomer. This drug was first seized along with three kilograms of acetylfentanyl in an April 25, 2013 police action in Montreal, Canada, and has reportedly continued to be available on the designer drug market internationally. Analogues where the para-bromine is replaced by chlorine or a methyl group retain similar activity, while the meta-hydroxyl derivative demonstrated robust antagonist activity.

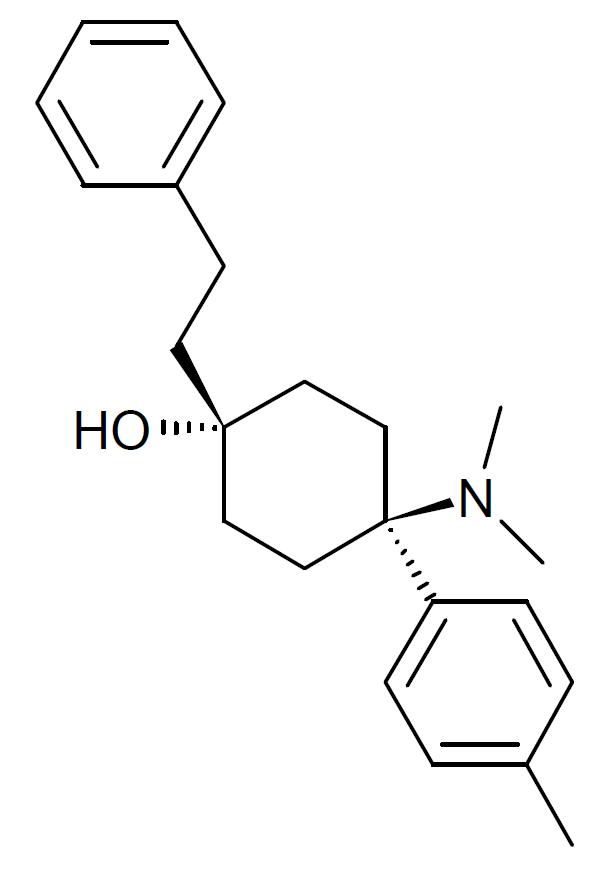
p-methyl analogue of BDPC

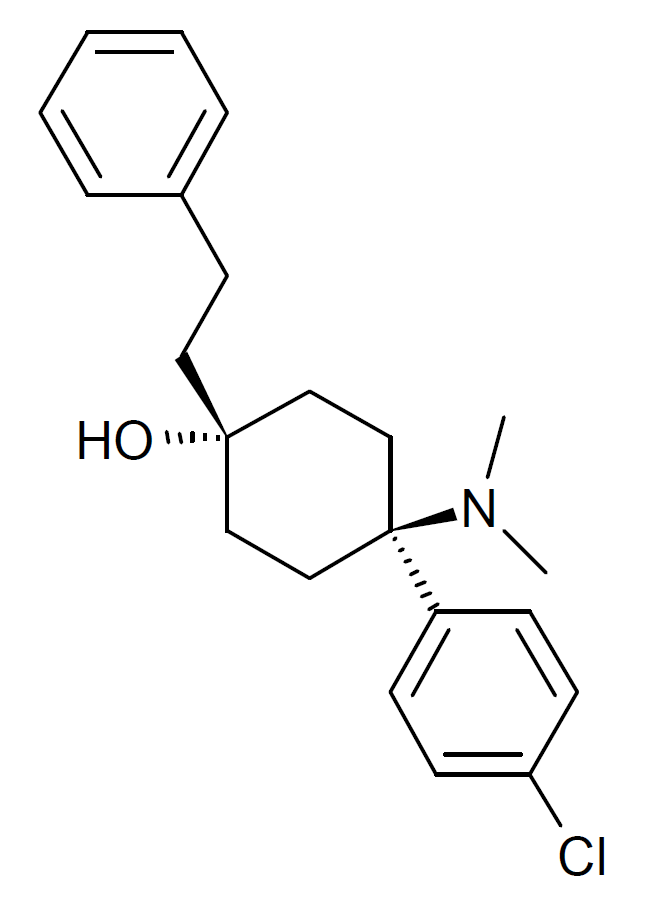
p-chloro analogue of BDPC.

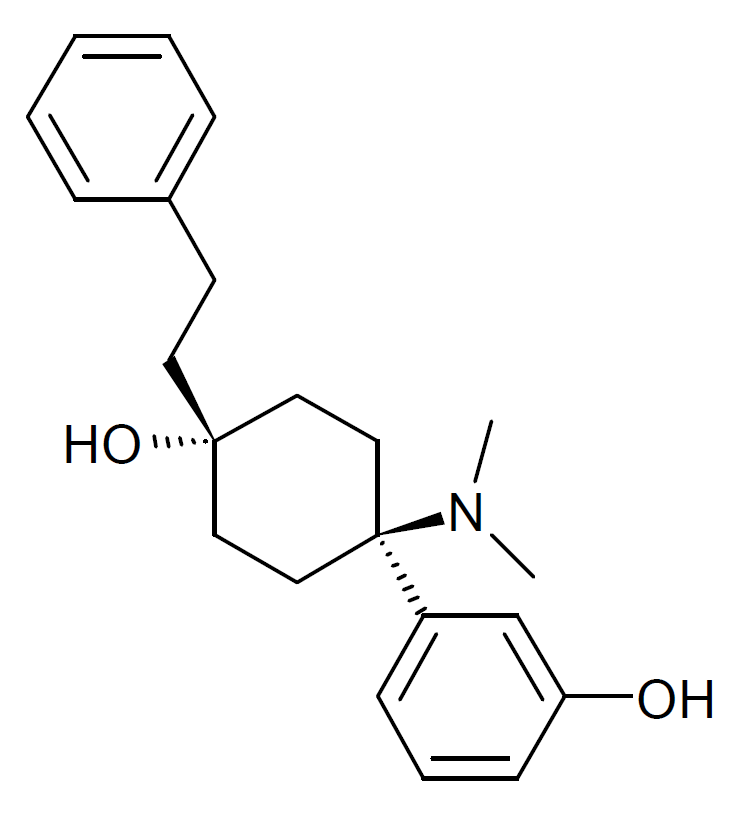
m-hydroxy analogue of BDPC.

== See also ==
- 3-HO-PCP
- 4-Keto-PCP
- C-8813
- Cebranopadol
- Ciramadol
- Dimetamine
- Faxeladol
- Profadol
- Tapentadol
- Tramadol
