= List of drugs: Pj–Pra =

This multi-page article lists pharmaceutical drugs alphabetically by name. Many drugs have more than one name and, therefore, the same drug may be listed more than once. Brand names and generic names are differentiated by capitalizing brand names.

See also the list of the top 100 bestselling branded drugs, ranked by sales.

Abbreviations are used in the list as follows:

- INN = International nonproprietary name
- BAN = British Approved Name
- USAN = United States Adopted Name
- Two-letter codes for countries

Lists of drugs
1–9 | A | B | C | D | E | F | G | H | I | J | K | L | M | N | O | P | Q | R | S | T | U | V | W | X | Y | Z

Pa | Pb–Pe | Pf–Ph | Pi | Pj–Pra | Prb–Prn | Pro–Prz | Ps–Pz

== pl ==
=== pla-pli ===
- Placadine
- Placidyl
- plafibride (INN)
- Plan B
- Plaquenil
- Plasma-Lyte
- Platinol
- plaunotol (INN)
- plauracin (INN)
- Plavix
- pleconaril (INN)
- Plegine
- Plegisol
- Plenaxis
- Plendil
- Plenvu
- plerixafor (USAN, (INN))
- Pletal
- pleuromulin (INN)
- plicamycin (INN)
- plinabulin (USAN, INN)
- plitidepsin (INN)

=== plo-plu ===
- plomestane (INN)
- plovamer (USAN)
- plozasiran (USAN, INN)
- plusonermin pranosal (INN)
- Pluvicto

== pm ==
- PMB. Redirects to Polymyxin B.

== po ==
=== pob-poh ===
- pobilukast (INN)
- podilfen (INN)
- Poherdy

=== pol ===
==== pola-polo ====
- polacrilin (INN)
- polaprezinc (INN)
- Polaramine
- poldine metilsulfate (INN)
- policresulen (INN)
- polidexide sulfate (INN)
- polidronium chloride (INN)
- polifeprosan (INN)
- poligeenan (INN)
- poliglecaprone (INN)
- poliglusam (INN)
- polihexanide (INN)
- polisaponin (INN)
- Polivy
- polixetonium chloride (INN)
- Polocaine
- poloxalene (INN)
- poloxamer (INN)

==== poly ====
- Poly-Pred
- Poly-Rx

===== polyb-polyn =====
- polybenzarsol (INN)
- polycarbophil (INN)
- polyestradiol phosphate (INN)
- polyetadene (INN)
- polygeline (INN)
- polyglycolic acid (INN)
- Polymox
- polymyxin B (INN)
- polynoxylin (INN)

===== polys-polyt =====
- polysorbate 1 (INN)
- polysorbate 120 (INN)
- polysorbate 20 (INN)
- polysorbate 21 (INN)
- polysorbate 40 (INN)
- polysorbate 60 (INN)
- polysorbate 61 (INN)
- polysorbate 65 (INN)
- polysorbate 8 (INN)
- polysorbate 80 (INN)
- polysorbate 81 (INN)
- polysorbate 85 (INN)
- polysorbate (INN)
- Polysporin (Johnson & Johnson)
- polythiazide (INN)
- Polytrim (Allergan)

=== pom-poz ===
- pomalidomide (USAN)
- Pombiliti
- pomisartan (INN)
- ponalrestat (INN)
- ponatinib (INN)
- ponezumab (USAN)
- ponfibrate (INN)
- Ponlimsi
- Ponstel
- porfimer sodium (INN)
- porfiromycin (INN)
- Portalac
- Portela
- Portia
- posatirelin (INN)
- poskine (INN)
- Posluma
- potassium canrenoate (INN)
- potassium glucaldrate (INN)
- potassium nitrazepate (INN)
- potassium sulfate (USAN)
- Povan
- povidone (INN)
- pozanicline (USAN)

== pr ==
=== pra ===
==== prac-pras ====
- practolol (INN)
- pradefovir (USAN, (INN))
- prademagene zamikeracel (INN)
- prajmalium bitartrate (INN)
- pralatrexate (USAN)
- pralidoxime iodide (INN)
- pralmorelin (INN)
- pralnacasan (USAN)
- pramiconazole (USAN)
- Pramine
- pramipexole (INN)
- pramiracetam (INN)
- pramiverine (INN)
- pramlintide (INN)
- pramocaine (INN)
- Pramosone
- prampine (INN)
- pranazepide (INN)
- Prandase (Bayer AG) [Ca]. Redirects to acarbose.
- Prandin (Novo)
- pranidipine (INN)
- pranlukast (INN)
- pranolium chloride (INN)
- pranoprofen (INN)
- Prantal
- prasterone (INN)
- prasugrel (INN)

==== prav-praz ====
- Pravachol
- pravadoline (INN)
- pravastatin (INN)
- Pravigard Pac
- praxadine (INN)
- prazarelix (INN)
- prazepam (INN)
- prazepine (INN)
- praziquantel (INN)
- prazitone (INN)
- prazocillin (INN)
- prazosin (INN)
