= C16H23NO3 =

The molecular formula C_{16}H_{23}NO_{3} (molar mass: 277.36 g/mol) may refer to:

- Pargolol
- N-Ethylheptylone
