= List of drugs: Pf–Ph =

This multi-page article lists pharmaceutical drugs alphabetically by name. Many drugs have more than one name and, therefore, the same drug may be listed more than once. Brand names and generic names are differentiated by capitalizing brand names.

See also the list of the top 100 bestselling branded drugs, ranked by sales.

Abbreviations are used in the list as follows:

- INN = International nonproprietary name
- BAN = British Approved Name
- USAN = United States Adopted Name
- Two-letter codes for countries

Lists of drugs
1–9 | A | B | C | D | E | F | G | H | I | J | K | L | M | N | O | P | Q | R | S | T | U | V | W | X | Y | Z

Pa | Pb–Pe | Pf–Ph | Pi | Pj–Pra | Prb–Prn | Pro–Prz | Ps–Pz

== pf ==
- Pfizer-E
- Pfizerpen

== ph ==
=== pha ===
- phanquinone (INN)
- Pharmaseal Scrub Care

=== phe ===
==== phen ====
===== phena-phend =====
- phenacaine (INN)
- phenacemide (INN)
- phenacetin (INN)
- phenactropinium chloride (INN)
- phenadoxone (INN)
- phenaglycodol (INN)
- phenamazoline (INN)
- phenampromide (INN)
- Phenaphen
- phenarsone sulfoxylate (INN)
- Phenazine
- phenazocine (INN)
- phenazone (INN)
- phenazopyridine (INN)
- phencyclidine (INN)
- phendimetrazine (INN)

===== phene-phenm =====
- phenelzine (INN)
- Phenergan
- pheneridine (INN)
- pheneticillin (INN)
- Phenetron
- pheneturide (INN)
- phenformin (INN)
- phenglutarimide (INN)
- phenicarbazide (INN)
- phenindamine (INN)
- phenindione (INN)
- pheniodol sodium (INN)
- pheniprazine (INN)
- pheniramine (INN)
- phenmetrazine (INN)

===== pheno-phenu =====
- phenobarbital sodium (INN)
- phenobarbital (INN)
- phenobutiodil (INN)
- phenolphthalein (INN)
- phenomorphan (INN)
- phenoperidine (INN)
- phenothiazine (INN)
- phenothrin (INN)
- phenoxybenzamine (INN)
- phenoxymethylpenicillin (INN)
- phenprobamate (INN)
- phenprocoumon (INN)
- phenpromethamine (INN)
- phensuximide (INN)
- phentermine (INN)
- phentolamine (INN)
- Phenurone

===== pheny =====
- Pheny-Pas-Tebamin
- phenylalanine (INN)
- phenylbutazone (INN)
- phenylephrine (INN)
- phenylmercuric borate (INN)
- phenylpropanolamine (INN)
- phenyltoloxamine (INN)
- phenyracillin (INN)
- Phenytek
- phenythilone (INN)
- phenytoin (INN)

==== pher-phet ====
- Pherazine
- Phesgo
- phetharbital (INN)

=== phi-phy ===
- Phiso-Scrub
- Phisohex
- pholcodine (INN)
- pholedrine (INN)
- Phoslo
- Phosphocol P32
- Phospholine Iodide
- Phosphotec
- Phosphotope
- Photofrin
- Photofrin (QLT Phototherapeutics Inc.)
- phoxim (INN)
- Phrenilin
- phthalylsulfamethizole (INN)
- phthalylsulfathiazole (INN)
- Phyllocontin
- Phyrago
- Physiolyte
- Physiosol
- phytomenadione (INN)
- phytonadiol sodium diphosphate (INN)
