= Ciramadol =

Opioid analgesic drug

Clinical data
- Other names: Ciramadol, WY-15705
- Routes of administration: Oral
- ATC code: none

Identifiers
- IUPAC name: 3-{(R)-Dimethylamino-[(1R,2R)-2-hydroxycyclohexyl]}methyl]phenol
- CAS Number: 63269-31-8
- PubChem CID: 44463
- ChemSpider: 40461
- UNII: 9NQ109OW0G
- KEGG: D03523
- ChEMBL: ChEMBL2104132
- CompTox Dashboard (EPA): DTXSID601018412

Chemical and physical data
- Formula: C_{15}H_{23}NO_{2}
- Molar mass: 249.354 g·mol^{−1}
- 3D model (JSmol): Interactive image
- SMILES: OC1=CC=CC([C@@H]([C@H]2CCCC[C@H]2O)N(C)C)=C1
- InChI: InChI=1S/C15H23NO2/c1-16(2)15(11-6-5-7-12(17)10-11)13-8-3-4-9-14(13)18/h5-7,10,13-15,17-18H,3-4,8-9H2,1-2H3/t13-,14+,15-/m0/s1; Key:UVTLONZTPXCUPU-ZNMIVQPWSA-N

Ciramadol (WY-15,705) is an opioid analgesic that was developed in the late 1970s and is related to phencyclidine, tramadol, tapentadol and venlafaxine. It is a mixed agonist-antagonist for the μ-opioid receptor with relatively low abuse potential and a ceiling on respiratory depression which makes it a relatively safe drug. It has a slightly higher potency and effectiveness as an analgesic than codeine, but is weaker than morphine. Other side effects include sedation and nausea but these are generally less severe than with other similar drugs.

== Synthesis ==
Ciramadol synthesis: Patents:

The Claisen-Schmidt condensation between 3-(methoxymethoxy)benzaldehyde [13709-05-2] (1) and cyclohexanone (2) afforded CID:54364197 (3). Michael addition of dimethylamine leads the aminoketone, i.e. 2-[dimethylamino-[3-(methoxymethoxy)phenyl]methyl]cyclohexan-1-one, CID21518320. Reduction of the ketone proceeds stereospecifically to afford the cis aminoalcohol [51356-58-2] (4). Mild hydrolysis of the product gives the free phenol ciramadol (5).

== See also ==
- Bromadol
- C-8813
- Faxeladol
- Profadol
- Tapentadol
- Tramadol
