= Faxeladol =

Chemical compound

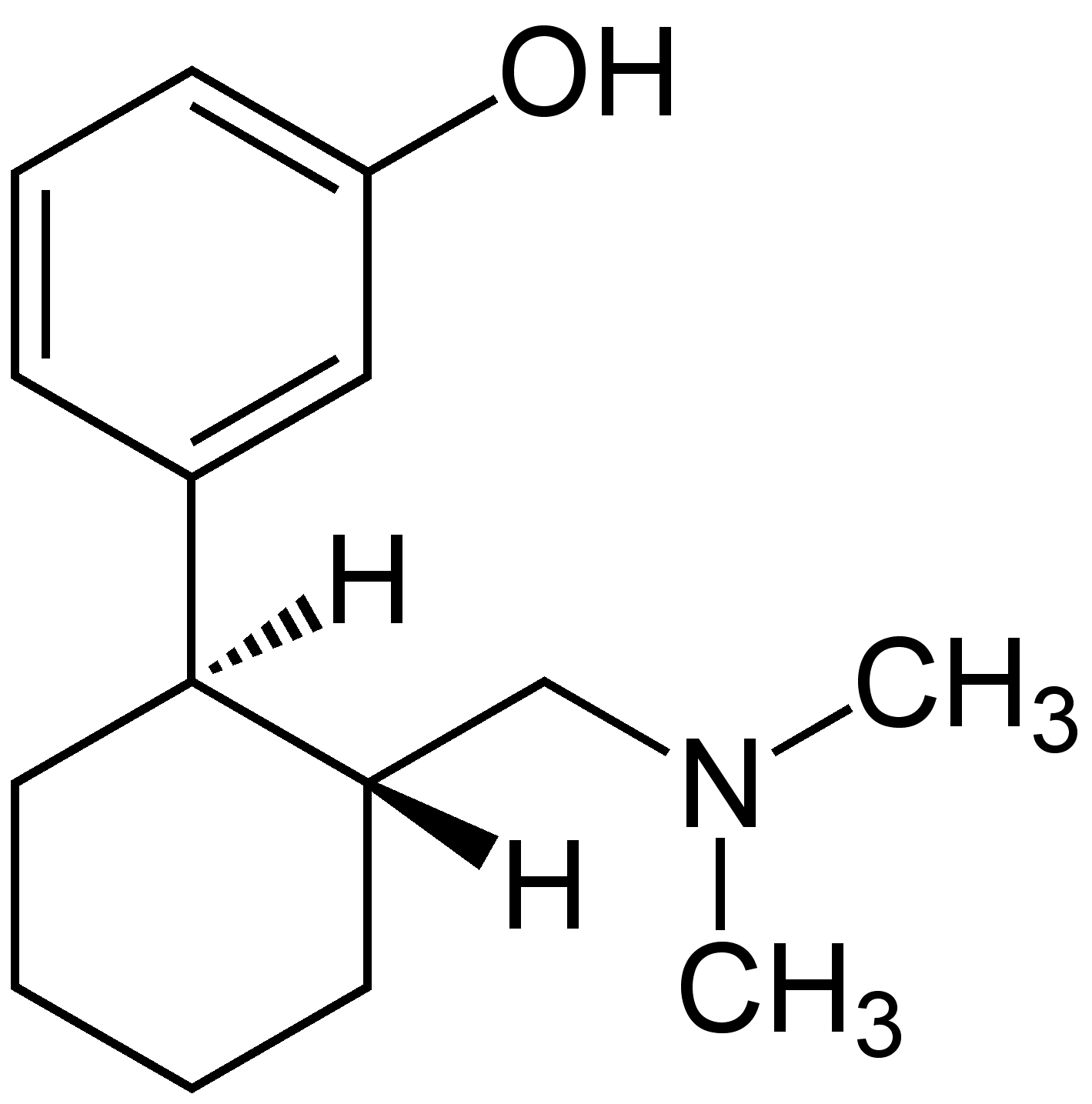

Clinical data
- Other names: Faxeladol
- ATC code: None

Identifiers
- IUPAC name: 3-[(1R,2R)-2-dimethylaminomethylcyclohexyl]phenol
- CAS Number: 433265-65-7
- PubChem CID: 9813414
- ChemSpider: 7989164
- UNII: C04V6SGK8H
- KEGG: D10007
- CompTox Dashboard (EPA): DTXSID20912318

Chemical and physical data
- Formula: C_{15}H_{23}NO
- Molar mass: 233.355 g·mol^{−1}
- 3D model (JSmol): Interactive image
- SMILES: Oc1cccc(c1)[C@@H]2CCCC[C@H]2CN(C)C
- InChI: InChI=1S/C15H23NO/c1-16(2)11-13-6-3-4-9-15(13)12-7-5-8-14(17)10-12/h5,7-8,10,13,15,17H,3-4,6,9,11H2,1-2H3/t13-,15-/m0/s1; Key:JIRYWFYYBBRJAN-ZFWWWQNUSA-N

Faxeladol (INN, USAN) (code names GRTA-9906, GRTA-0009906, EM-906, GCR-9905, GRT-TA300) is an opioid analgesic which was developed by Grünenthal GmbH but was never marketed for medical use anywhere in the world. It is related to tramadol and ciramadol, and was developed shortly after tramadol in the late 1970s. Similarly to tramadol, it was believed faxeladol would have analgesic, as well as antidepressant effects, due to its action on serotonin and norepinephrine reuptake. In various studies in the 1970s alongside tramadol, faxeladol was seen to be slightly more potent than tramadol, but with a higher rate of sudden seizures than tramadol, which is known to cause seizures without warning in some users.

== See also ==
- Bromadol
- Profadol
- Tapentadol
- Thiobromadol
