= Pre-exposure prophylaxis =

Proactive use of medications to prevent the spread of disease

Pre-exposure prophylaxis (PrEP) is the use of medications to prevent the spread of disease in people who have not yet been exposed to a disease-causing agent. Vaccination is the most commonly used form of pre-exposure prophylaxis; other forms of pre-exposure prophylaxis generally involve drug treatment, known as chemoprophylaxis. Examples include taking medication to prevent infection by malaria or HIV. In particular, the term PrEP is now synonymous in popular usage with the use of pre-exposure prophylaxis for HIV prevention.

In general, the use of pre-exposure prophylaxis requires balancing the risks of the treatment (e.g., side effects from a drug) to healthy individuals with the risk of the disease.

It is contrasted with post-exposure prophylaxis (PEP), which is used once the patient has already been exposed to the infectious agent.

== Use of pre-exposure medication against specific diseases ==
=== Malaria ===
The use of pre-exposure drug treatment to prevent malaria using antimalarial drugs is well-established, with the use of quinine as a prophylactic treatment dating back at least to the 19th century.

=== HIV/AIDS ===
The abbreviation PrEP now often refers to pre-exposure prophylaxis for HIV prevention, the use of antiviral drugs as a strategy for the prevention of HIV/AIDS. PrEP is one of a number of HIV prevention strategies for people who are HIV-negative but who have a higher risk of acquiring HIV, including sexually active adults at increased risk of contracting HIV, people who engage in intravenous drug use (see drug injection), and HIV-negative members of serodiscordant sexually active couples.

When used as directed, PrEP has been shown to be highly effective at preventing HIV infection, reducing the risk of acquiring HIV by up to 99%. A large-scale study in the UK has shown that PrEP remains effective at preventing HIV infection, even when used in uncontrolled environments.

=== COVID-19 ===
Pre-exposure prophylaxis against infection by SARS-CoV-2, the virus that causes COVID-19, has been studied as a possible preventive measure for high-risk groups.

In December 2021, the US FDA granted emergency use authorization (EUA) of the antibody drug tixagevimab/cilgavimab (Evusheld) to prevent COVID-19 in immunocompromised people who cannot be fully vaccinated due to a history of a severe reaction to coronavirus vaccines. However, due to the high levels of non-susceptible SARS-CoV-2 variants present in the US, the FDA announced on 6 January 2023 that tixagevimab/cilgavimab was no longer currently authorized for emergency use in the US.

In March 2024, pemivibart (Pemgarda), a monoclonal antibody drug, received an emergency use authorization from the US FDA to protect certain moderately to severely immunocompromised individuals against COVID-19.

=== Rabies ===
Pre-exposure prophylaxis against infection by the rabies virus, the virus that causes rabies, is recommended for high-risk individuals such as veterinarians, travelers to rabies-endemic areas, and individuals from rabies-endemic areas (especially children and people from rural areas where rabies post-exposure prophylaxis might not be readily accessible).

The standard dosage for rabies pre-exposure prophylaxis is two 1ml doses of the rabies vaccine (HDCV, PCEC, or PVRV) administered intramuscularly (IM) on Days 0 and 7. The vaccines used for rabies pre-exposure prophylaxis are the same ones used for post-exposure prophylaxis.

== Pre-exposure prophylaxis for post-mortems ==
Since conducting autopsies may involve inadvertent cuts, and the incidence of hepatitis-B can be very high in certain populations, it is advisable for all autopsy personnel to get their hepatitis-B antibody status tested. If antibodies are not present in sufficient concentrations, a hepatitis-B vaccine is recommended.
