= Michelle Xia =

Chinese billionaire businesswoman

- Born: Xia Yu; 1966 or 1967 (age 59–60)
- Known for: Founder, CEO, chairwoman and president of Akeso

Michelle Xia (Chinese: 夏瑜; born 1966 or 1967) is a Chinese biopharmaceutical executive. She founded Akeso in 2012 and serves as the company's chairwoman, president, and chief executive officer.

== Early life and education ==
Xia was born in Gansu province. She is the daughter of two university-educated engineers.

She earned a degree in biochemistry from Sun Yat-sen University in Guangzhou in 1988, and a doctorate in molecular biology and microbiology from Newcastle University in the UK. She also undertook postgraduate study at the University of Glasgow. In 1996, she moved to the United States to conduct cancer research at the University of Louisville.

== Career ==
Xia co‑founded Akeso in 2012 and has served as chairwoman, president and CEO since inception. The company listed on the Main Board of the Hong Kong Stock Exchange in April 2020. Earlier in her career she held scientific or leadership roles at Crown Bioscience, PDL BioPharma, and Bayer. Since 2023, she has served on the board of Summit Therapeutics.

Under Xia, Akeso have developed Ivonescimab, which appears to outperform Pembrolizumab (marketed as Keytruda), produced by Merck in the US.

In March 2025, she was included in the "TIME100 Health" list.

As of July 2025, Forbes estimates her net worth at US$1.2 billion.
