= Sulfafurazole =

Chemical compound

Clinical data
- AHFS/Drugs.com: International Drug Names
- MedlinePlus: a601049
- Pregnancy category: To be avoided within two months of term
- Routes of administration: Oral
- ATC code: J01EB05 (WHO) S01AB02 (WHO) QJ01EQ05 (WHO)

Legal status
- Legal status: In general: ℞ (Prescription only)

Pharmacokinetic data
- Excretion: Excreted unchanged in urine

Identifiers
- IUPAC name: 4-Amino-N-(3,4-dimethyl-1,2-oxazol-5-yl)benzenesulfonamide
- CAS Number: 127-69-5
- PubChem CID: 5344
- DrugBank: DB00263
- ChemSpider: 5151
- UNII: 740T4C525W
- KEGG: D00450
- ChEMBL: ChEMBL453
- CompTox Dashboard (EPA): DTXSID6021292
- ECHA InfoCard: 100.004.418

Chemical and physical data
- Formula: C_{11}H_{13}N_{3}O_{3}S
- Molar mass: 267.30 g·mol^{−1}
- 3D model (JSmol): Interactive image
- Melting point: 194 °C (381 °F)
- SMILES: Cc1c(C)noc1NS(=O)(=O)c2ccc(N)cc2
- InChI: InChI=1S/C11H13N3O3S/c1-7-8(2)13-17-11(7)14-18(15,16)10-5-3-9(12)4-6-10/h3-6,14H,12H2,1-2H3; Key:NHUHCSRWZMLRLA-UHFFFAOYSA-N

Sulfafurazole (INN, also known as sulfisoxazole) is a sulfonamide antibacterial with a dimethyl-isoxazole substituent. It possesses antibiotic activity against a wide range of Gram-negative and Gram-positive organisms. It is sometimes given in combination with erythromycin (see erythromycin/sulfafurazole) or phenazopyridine. It is used locally in a 4% solution or ointment.
