= Assertio Therapeutics =

American pharmaceutical company

Assertio Therapeutics, Inc.
- Type: Public
- Traded as: Nasdaq: ASRT
- Industry: Pharmaceutical
- Founded: 1995; 31 years ago
- Headquarters: Newark, California
- Key people: Dan A. Peisert (CEO)
- Products: Pharmaceuticals
- Revenue: ▼US$57.2 million (2019)
- Operating income: ▲US$3.33 million (2019)
- Net income: ▼US$-13.6 million (2019)
- Number of employees: 116 (2019)
- Website: www.assertiotx.com

Assertio Therapeutics, Inc. (formerly Depomed, Inc.) is an American specialty pharmaceutical company. It mainly markets products for treatment in neurology, pain and diseases of the central nervous system. Depomed was founded in 1995 and is headquartered in Newark, California. It is a publicly traded company on NASDAQ, with several products approved by the United States Food and Drug Administration (FDA). On August 15, 2018, the company announced its name change from Depomed, Inc., to Assertio Therapeutics, Inc. As of 2019, Assertio markets three products approved by the FDA: Gralise, Cambia, and Zipsor.

== History ==
=== 1995-2009 ===
Depomed was founded in 1995 and later became headquartered in Newark, California. A joint venture between Élan and Depomed, DDL, was established in January 2000. Élan withdrew from operational involvement in September 2003, with Depomed gaining full ownership. In September 2003, the company's subsidiary Depomed Development Ltd. acquired the exclusive rights to develop and commercialize Gabapentin ER. The drug had been developed by DDL. 2003 saw a net loss of $30 million, compared to $13.5 million in 2002. In 2004, John W. Fara was president, CEO, and chairman. The company had 75 people, and was starting a new focus on marketing after FDA approvals for Proquin XR and Depomed's filing of Glumetza for approval. By May 2004, Depomed had been issued a patent covering the use of gabapentin to treat hot flushes. That month, it also received a patent covering "proprietary polymer combinations (as used in AcuForm tablets) to create improved formulations of existing drugs." The patent was first sublicensed to the University of Rochester, then PharmaNova in October 2006. The company faced a net loss of $24.5 million in 2005, compared to a net loss of $27 million in 2004.

In April 2006, Depomed entered a license agreement with Esprit Pharma over Proquin XR, a "prolonged-release formulation of ciprofloxacin hydrochloride" to treat urinary tract infections. In July 2008, the FDA released a warning about drugs such as Depomed Inc's Proquin XR, an antibiotic, about the risk of tendonitis and ruptured tendons.

=== 2010-2014 ===
By 2010 the company was based in Menlo Park, California, and stated it intended to become profitable in 2011. By 2010, Depomed was supplying its entire logistics system with plastic pallets, after it had to recall a shipment of the diabetes drug Glumetza for potential contamination of wood pallets. As of March 2011, Carl A. Pelzel was CEO and president of Depomed. Depomed had one approved product on the market, Gralise, and had one other approved but not released: Glumetza. That month, Boehringer Ingelheim purchased the rights to use Depomed's Acuform manufacturing technology. The FDA approved Gralise for the management of postherpetic neralgia in January 2012.

On June 21, 2012, Depomed acquired the rights to Zipsor, an NSAID made by Xanodyne Pharmaceuticals. In particular, the Zipsor Liquid Filled Capsules were acquired. Revenue generated by Zipsor was approximately US$19,000,000 as within the twelve months from June 2011 to May 2012. For $240 million, DL BioPharma purchased the royalty rights to Depomed's Glumetza, a type 2 diabetes drug, in October 2013. The year prior, Depomed had generated $43 million in royalty revenue off the drug.

=== 2015-2017 ===
In January 2015, Depomed acquired Nucynta ER and XR from Johnson & Johnson for $1.05 billion. Horizon Pharma made a hostile $3 billion bid for Depomed in July 2015, withdrawing the bid after the Depomed board rejected the offer. At the time, Depomed had five pain treatments on the market, including Nucynta, considered its flagship product. Assets in 2015 came to $1.3 billion. Equity that year was $315 million, and it had 494 employees that December.

In early April 2016, activist investor Starboard Value accused DepoMed of being "unfriendly to shareholders," noting in part a plan to relocate from California to Delaware. Several weeks later, the Delaware move was dropped. In September 2016, there were reports that Depomed was considering a sale, after Starboard called for the option to be explored in April 2016. In October 2016, Starboard Value struck a deal with Depomed that gave the former three more spots on Depomed's board. In March 2017, more activity by activist investors resulted in CEO Jim Schoeneck being replaced by Arthur Higgins. In December 2017, Depomed announced it was moving away from the opioid market and divesting of its Nucynta opioid franchise. Nucynta's rights were sold to Collegium Pharmaceutical, for $10 million upfront and royalty payments until December 2022. That year, Depomed's net revenue was $381 million.

=== 2018-2019 ===
In January 2018 the company laid off 40% of its workforce after the divestment of its pain medication Nucynta. On August 15, 2018, the company announced its name change from Depomed, Inc., to Assertio Therapeutics, Inc. In 2018, Assertio also moved its headquarters from California to Lake Forest, from Newark, California to Lake Forest, Illinois.

By March 2019, Assertio's stock had lost half its value since 2016. In September 2019, Crain's Chicago Business argued that Assertio's diversification campaign was "sputtering", with Assertio stock having dropped 80% in the prior year. Operating income in 2019 was $3.33 million. Becker's Hospital Review listed it as one of 31 drugmakers at high risk of going bankrupt in 2020.

== Products and manufacturing ==
By 2010 the company was based in Menlo Park, California, and was known for improving "the bio-availability of generic drugs by using polymers usually used in the food and cosmetics industry to reduce side effects and lower the doses necessary for oral medications." As of 2019, Assertio markets three products approved by the FDA: Gralise, Cambia, and Zipsor. The company's products include Gralise, Cambia, Lazanda, Zipsor, and DM-1992, which mainly focus on pain, neuropathic pain, and central nervous system diseases.

In January 2011, Gralise once-daily (gabapentin extended release) was approved by the US FDA for the treatment of postherpetic neuralgia. The drug has also received Orphan Drug designation from the FDA.

The company's diabetes treatment, Glumetza (metformin hydrochloride extended release tablet), was approved for the treatment of type II diabetes in adults, and is sold in the US by Valeant.

== Former products ==
Assertio Therapeutics previously owned Nucynta ER and Nucynta IR. On January 15, 2015, Depomed announced the acquisition of the Tapentadol(Nucynta) franchise from Janssen Pharmaceutica for US$1,050,000,000 in cash. The transaction closed on April 2, 2015, and the products were relaunched in June 2015 after a major sales force expansion. After Hurricane Maria in 2017 the company faced major shortages of the drug due to the manufacturing plant location in Puerto Rico. In January 2018, after less than 3 years, the manufacturing rights of Nucynta were sold for just $10 million upfront with a $135 million in royalties for the first 4 years. Tapentadol is now produced for the US and Canadian market by Collegium Pharmaceutical.

== Lawsuits ==
The company has been active in patent litigation. In 2002, the company received $18 million from the Bristol-Myers Squibb Company concerning a patent litigation settlement. In April 2008, Depomed sued IVAX for introducing a generic Glumetza product, forcing IVAX's owner Teva Pharmaceutical Industries into paying a $7.5 million settlement on the matter. By May 2010, Depomed also had had patient victories against Viovail Corporation.

In March 2012, the company filed a patent infringement lawsuit against three companies that had filed Abbreviated New Drug Applications with the US FDA, claiming infringement of Depomed's six US patents listed for Gralise in the FDA's Orange Book. In August 2018, Purdue Pharma paid Assertio $62 million to settle a patent infringement lawsuit. The suit had been filed in 2013, alleging Purdue infringed on certain patents relating to OxyContin.

The company has faced a number of lawsuits related to its marketing of the Nucynta opioid painkiller, with Assertio denying wrongdoing. In January 2019, an insurer had asked California federal courts if it had to cover Assertio's defense in opioid-related cases filed in approximately 38 different cases in 2018. In March 2019, Assertio won a dismissal of a lawsuit by shareholders that accused the company of hiding how much its growth was dependent on Nucynta marketing for off-label purposes. According to the judge, the plaintiffs failed to provide evidence of a scheme.

== See also ==
- Health care in the United States
- Cebranopadol
