= Profadol =

Chemical compound

Clinical data
- ATC code: none

Legal status
- Legal status: US: Analogue to a Schedule I/II drug (Analogue of Tapentadol, Schedule II)

Identifiers
- IUPAC name: 3-(1-methyl-3-propyl-pyrrolidin-3-yl)phenol
- CAS Number: 428-37-5
- PubChem CID: 9882
- ChemSpider: 9498
- UNII: 41GDG43FTT
- ChEMBL: ChEMBL161204
- CompTox Dashboard (EPA): DTXSID30861924

Chemical and physical data
- Formula: C_{14}H_{21}NO
- Molar mass: 219.328 g·mol^{−1}

Profadol (CI-572) is an opioid analgesic which was developed in the 1960s by Parke-Davis. It acts as a mixed agonist-antagonist of the μ-opioid receptor. The analgetic potency is about the same as of pethidine (meperidine), the antagonistic effect is 1/50 of nalorphine.

== Synthesis ==
Synthesis: Patents:

The Knoevenagel condensation between 3'-Methoxybutyrophenone [21550-06-1] and Ethyl cyanoacetate gives (1). Conjugate addition of cyanide gives (2). Hydrolysis of both nitrile groups, saponification of the ester and decarboxylation gives the diacid, CID:164137621 (3). Imide formation occurs upon treatment with methylamine giving 3-(3-Methoxyphenyl)-1-methyl-3-propylpyrrolidine-2,5-dione, CID:163444474 (4). Reduction of the imide by lithium aluminium hydride gave [1505-32-4][29369-01-5] (5). Demethylation completed the synthesis of Profadol (6).

== See also ==
- Bromadol
- C-8813
- Ciramadol
- Faxeladol
- Prodilidine
- Tapentadol
- Tramadol
