= Akeso =

Chinese Biopharmaceutical Company

Akeso, Inc
- Native name: 康方生物科技(開曼)有限公司
- Company type: Public
- Traded as: SEHK: 9926
- Industry: Biopharmaceutical
- Founded: 19 March 2012; 14 years ago
- Founders: Michelle Xia; Baiyong Li; Max Wang; Peng Zhang
- Headquarters: Zhongshan, Guangdong, China
- Key people: Michelle Xia (Chairwoman & CEO)
- Revenue: ▼CN¥2.04 billion (2024)
- Net income: ▼CN¥−501.09 million (2024)
- Total assets: ▲CN¥12.76 billion (2024)
- Total equity: ▲CN¥6.75 billion (2024)
- Number of employees: 3,035 (2024)
- Website: www.akesobio.com

Akeso, Inc (Akeso; Chinese: 康方生物; pinyin: Kāngfāng Shēngwù) is a publicly listed Chinese biopharmaceutical company that is headquartered in Zhongshan, Guangdong.

It is best known for developing Ivonescimab, a cancer treatment antibody.

== History ==
Akeso was founded in 2012 by Michelle Xia and three other co-founders. Its name comes from the Greek goddess of healing, Aceso. At the time, China had few labs capable of finding drugs on their own. Akeso started with a little less than $3 million in venture capital funding. It rented an office and brought on researchers with undergraduate degrees. The founders didn't receive salaries.

In 2015, Akeso won a licensing deal with Merck & Co., which bought the worldwide rights to develop and commercialize Quavonlimab, a cancer treatment antibody. The deal gave Akeso credibility and enabled it to expand.

In April 2020, Akeso held its initial public offering and became a listed company of the Hong Kong Stock Exchange.

In September 2024, Akeso's Ivonescimab was said to have beaten Keytruda in a trial held in China. This was considered a watershed moment for Chinese pharmaceutical companies although it did not receive much attention at the time. However, as of September 2025, further studies showed Ivonescimab had not yet demonstrated a good enough survival benefit in patients in the study for US approval.

In April 2025, the Food and Drug Administration approved Akeso's Penpulimab making it the first product from Akeso to be approved by US regulators.

== See also ==
- Pfizer
- Bristol Myers Squibb
- Roche
