= Endopeptidase So =

Identifiers
- EC no.: 3.4.21.67
- CAS no.: 81611-83-8

Databases
- IntEnz: IntEnz view
- BRENDA: BRENDA entry
- ExPASy: NiceZyme view
- KEGG: KEGG entry
- MetaCyc: metabolic pathway
- PRIAM: profile
- PDB structures: RCSB PDB PDBe PDBsum
Search
- PMC: articles
- PubMed: articles
- NCBI: proteins

Endopeptidase So (EC 3.4.21.67, E. coli cytoplasmic proteinase, proteinase So, Escherichia coli serine proteinase So) is an enzyme. This enzyme catalyses the following chemical reaction

Hydrolysis of proteins, but not Bz-Tyr-OEt, Ac-Phe-beta-naphthylester, or Bz-Arg-OEt

This is an Escherichia coli cytoplasmic endopeptidase.
