= Thermitase =

Identifiers
- EC no.: 3.4.21.66
- CAS no.: 69772-87-8

Databases
- IntEnz: IntEnz view
- BRENDA: BRENDA entry
- ExPASy: NiceZyme view
- KEGG: KEGG entry
- MetaCyc: metabolic pathway
- PRIAM: profile
- PDB structures: RCSB PDB PDBe PDBsum
Search
- PMC: articles
- PubMed: articles
- NCBI: proteins

Thermitase (EC 3.4.21.66, thermophilic Streptomyces serine proteinase, Thermoactinomyces vulgaris serine proteinase) is an enzyme. This enzyme catalyses the following chemical reaction

Hydrolysis of proteins, including collagen

This peptidase is isolated from Thermoactinomyces vulgaris.
