= Pexelizumab =

Monoclonal antibody
- Type: Single-chain variable fragment
- Source: Humanized (from mouse)
- Target: Complement component 5

Clinical data
- ATC code: none

Legal status
- Legal status: investigational

Identifiers
- CAS Number: 219685-93-5
- ChemSpider: none
- UNII: CHZ6OLQ3UU
- KEGG: D10023

Pexelizumab is a drug designed to reduce side effects of coronary artery bypass grafting and angioplasty, among other types of cardiac surgery. It is a single chain variable fragment of a monoclonal antibody targeted against component 5 of the complement system.

== Current status ==
Alexion, the developer of pexelizumab, stopped development when the phase 3 trial indicated the heart-attack drug is no better than placebo.
