= Penpulimab =

Monoclonal antibody

Monoclonal antibody
- Type: Whole antibody
- Source: Humanized (from mouse)
- Target: PD-1

Clinical data
- Other names: AK105, penpulimab-kcqx
- MedlinePlus: a625068
- License data: US DailyMed: Penpulimab
- Routes of administration: Intravenous
- Drug class: Antineoplastic agent
- ATC code: None

Legal status
- Legal status: US: ℞-only; In general: ℞ (Prescription only)

Identifiers
- CAS Number: 2350298-92-7
- PubChem SID: 472421278
- IUPHAR/BPS: 12347
- DrugBank: DB16747
- UNII: IBS1BZ4E4I
- KEGG: D12198
- ChEMBL: ChEMBL4297571

Chemical and physical data
- Formula: C_{6434}H_{9922}N_{1718}O_{2012}S_{46}
- Molar mass: 145008.92 g·mol^{−1}

Penpulimab is a humanized monoclonal antibody used for the treatment of cancer. It targets the programmed cell death protein 1 (PD-1) receptor. It is developed by Akeso.

Penpulimab was approved for medical use in China in August 2021, and in the United States in April 2025.

== Medical uses ==
In the United States, penpulimab is indicated for the treatment of non-keratinizing nasopharyngeal carcinoma.

In August 2021, penpulimab received its first approval in China for the treatment of adults with relapsed or refractory classic Hodgkin lymphoma who have undergone at least second-line chemotherapy.

In January 2023, the National Medical Products Administration of China approved penpulimab in combination with chemotherapy for the first-line treatment of locally advanced or metastatic squamous non-small cell lung cancer.

== Adverse effects ==
The most common adverse effects associated with penpulimab include:

- Hypothyroidism - Fever - Elevated alanine aminotransferase levels - Decreased white blood cell count - Rash
- Grade 3 or higher immune-related adverse events (irAEs) reported in clinical trials include skin rash, hyperlipidemia, and lung infections.

== Pharmacology ==
=== Mechanism of action ===
Penpulimab binds to the PD-1 receptor on T cells, preventing interaction with its ligands, PD-L1 and PD-L2. This blockade restores T-cell-mediated immune responses against tumor cells. The antibody has been engineered with modifications to its Fc region to eliminate Fcγ receptor binding and Fc-mediated effector functions, reducing the risk of immune-related adverse effects such as antibody-dependent cellular cytotoxicity (ADCC) or phagocytosis.

Penpulimab demonstrates a slower dissociation rate from the PD-1 receptor compared to other PD-1 inhibitors, resulting in higher receptor occupancy and enhanced T-cell activity. This property is attributed to its unique binding interactions with the glycosylated N58 residue on the BC loop of the PD-1 receptor.

== Manufacturing ==
Penpulimab is produced using recombinant DNA technology in Chinese hamster ovary cells. It has been designed with an IgG1 backbone and modified Fc regions to minimize immune-related side effects.

== History ==
The efficacy of penpulimab with cisplatin or carboplatin and gemcitabine was evaluated in study AK105-304 (NCT04974398), a randomized, double-blind, multi-center trial in 291 participants with recurrent or metastatic nasopharyngeal carcinoma who had not received previous systemic chemotherapy for recurrent or metastatic disease. Participants were randomized (1:1) to receive either penpulimab with cisplatin or carboplatin and gemcitabine, followed by penpulimab, or placebo with cisplatin or carboplatin and gemcitabine, followed by placebo.

The efficacy of single-agent penpulimab was evaluated in study AK105-202 (NCT03866967), an open-label, multi-center, single-arm trial conducted in a single country. The trial included a total of 125 participants with unresectable or metastatic non-keratinizing nasopharyngeal carcinoma who had disease progression after platinum-based chemotherapy and at least one other line of therapy. Participants received penpulimab until disease progression or unacceptable toxicity, for a maximum of 24 months.

== Society and culture ==
=== Legal status ===
In March 2025, penpulimab, was approved by the National Medical Products Administration in China for the first-line treatment of recurrent or metastatic nasopharyngeal cancer in combination with chemotherapy.

In April 2025, the US Food and Drug Administration (FDA) approved penpulimab-kcqx with cisplatin or carboplatin and gemcitabine for the first-line treatment of adults with recurrent or metastatic non-keratinizing nasopharyngeal carcinoma. The FDA also approved penpulimab-kcqx as a single agent for adults with metastatic non-keratinizing nasopharyngeal carcinoma with disease progression on or after platinum-based chemotherapy and at least one other prior line of therapy. The FDA granted the application for penpulimab fast track, breakthrough therapy, and orphan drug designations.

=== Names ===
Penpulimab is the international nonproprietary name.

Penpulimab is sold under the brand name 安尼可 (Anike) in China.

=== Research ===
Penpulimab is being studied in various clinical trials to evaluate its efficacy and safety for additional cancer indications, including nasopharyngeal carcinoma, non-small-cell lung cancer, and other solid tumors.
