= Pegsunercept =

Chemical compound

Clinical data
- Routes of administration: subcutaneous injection
- ATC code: none

Legal status
- Legal status: investigational

Pharmacokinetic data
- Bioavailability: N/A

Identifiers
- CAS Number: 330988-75-5
- ChemSpider: none
- UNII: Q5I7SFZ853
- KEGG: D05393

Chemical and physical data
- Formula: C_{502}H_{758}N_{154}O_{165}S_{16}
- Molar mass: 12103.46 g·mol^{−1}

Pegsunercept is a drug for the treatment of rheumatoid arthritis. As of January 2010, Phase II clinical trials have been completed. It is being developed by Amgen.

Similarly to etanercept, pegsunercept is a soluble tumor necrosis factor receptor. Pegsunercept is a PEGylated protein.
