= Pelretin =

Synthetic retinoid

Names
- IUPAC name 14a,14b-Didehydro-14b,20-metheno-14a,14b-dihomoretinoic acid
- Systematic IUPAC name 4-[(1E,3E,5E)-4-Methyl-6-(2,6,6-trimethylcyclohex-1-en-1-yl)hexa-1,3,5-trien-1-yl]benzoic acid

Identifiers
CAS Number	91587-01-8
3D model (JSmol)	Interactive image
ChEMBL	ChEMBL39861
ChemSpider	4940263
KEGG	D05402
PubChem CID	6435504
UNII	H9MC68UEZ9
CompTox Dashboard (EPA)	DTXSID101032023
- InChI: InChI=1S/C23H28O2/c1-17(10-15-21-18(2)8-6-16-23(21,3)4)7-5-9-19-11-13-20(14-12-19)22(24)25/h5,7,9-15H,6,8,16H2,1-4H3,(H,24,25)/b9-5+,15-10+,17-7+ Key: YRNAHKPMDMVFMV-GMICYETFSA-N; InChI=1/C23H28O2/c1-17(10-15-21-18(2)8-6-16-23(21,3)4)7-5-9-19-11-13-20(14-12-19)22(24)25/h5,7,9-15H,6,8,16H2,1-4H3,(H,24,25)/b9-5+,15-10+,17-7+ Key: YRNAHKPMDMVFMV-GMICYETFBM
- SMILES: CC1=C(C(CCC1)(C)C)/C=C/C(=C/C=C/c2ccc(cc2)C(=O)O)/C

Properties
Chemical formula	C_{23}H_{28}O_{2}
Molar mass	336.475 g·mol^{−1}
- Except where otherwise noted, data are given for materials in their standard state (at 25 °C [77 °F], 100 kPa). Infobox references

Pelretin is a synthetic retinoid. It was tested in the 1980s on animals in the hope that it could be used to eliminate wrinkles.
