= Pemtumomab =

Monoclonal antibody

Monoclonal antibody
- Type: ?
- Source: Mouse
- Target: MUC1

Clinical data
- Trade names: Theragyn
- Routes of administration: Intraperitoneal
- ATC code: none

Identifiers
- CAS Number: 646032-04-4
- ChemSpider: none

Pemtumomab (trade name Theragyn) is a mouse monoclonal antibody used to treat cancer. The substance has affinity to various types of cancer, like ovarian cancer and peritoneal cancer, via the polymorphic epithelial mucin (PEM or MUC-1) and delivers the radioisotope Yttrium-90 into the tumour. As of 2009, it is undergoing Phase III clinical trials.

It has been granted orphan drug status in Europe.
