= Priliximab =

Monoclonal antibody

Monoclonal antibody
- Type: Whole antibody
- Source: Chimeric (mouse/human)
- Target: CD4

Clinical data
- ATC code: none

Identifiers
- CAS Number: 147191-91-1
- ChemSpider: none
- UNII: TW5DE23BLM

Priliximab (cMT 412) is a human-mouse chimeric anti-CD4 monoclonal antibody. It has been tested on patients with Crohn's disease and multiple sclerosis but has not yet received U.S. Food and Drug Administration licensing. The patent belongs to the biotechnology company Centocor.
