= Thermomycolin =

Identifiers
- EC no.: 3.4.21.65
- CAS no.: 52233-31-5

Databases
- IntEnz: IntEnz view
- BRENDA: BRENDA entry
- ExPASy: NiceZyme view
- KEGG: KEGG entry
- MetaCyc: metabolic pathway
- PRIAM: profile
- PDB structures: RCSB PDB PDBe PDBsum
Search
- PMC: articles
- PubMed: articles
- NCBI: proteins

Thermomycolin (EC 3.4.21.65, thermomycolase) is an enzyme. This enzyme catalyses the following chemical reaction

Rather nonspecific hydrolysis of proteins. Preferential cleavage: Ala-, Tyr-, Phe- in small molecule substrates

This peptidase is isolated from the thermophilic fungus Malbranchea pulchella.
