= Pleiocarpine =

Names
- IUPAC name dimethyl (9R,18R,21S)-2,12-diazahexacyclo[14.2.2.1^{9,12}.0^{1,9}.0^{3,8}.0^{16,21}]henicosa-3,5,7-triene-2,18-dicarboxylate

Identifiers
CAS Number	559-52-4
3D model (JSmol)	Interactive image
ChEBI	CHEBI:141940
ChEMBL	ChEMBL328281
ChemSpider	23181728
PubChem CID	44326078; 130476741
- InChI: InChI=1S/C23H28N2O4/c1-28-18(26)16-14-21-8-5-12-24-13-11-22(19(21)24)15-6-3-4-7-17(15)25(20(27)29-2)23(16,22)10-9-21/h3-4,6-7,16,19H,5,8-14H2,1-2H3/t16-,19-,21?,22+,23?/m0/s1 Key: SQVLFJQJOPEBAA-AUEHJUDRSA-N
- SMILES: COC(=O)[C@@H]1CC23CCCN4[C@@H]2[C@@]5(C1(CC3)N(C6=CC=CC=C65)C(=O)OC)CC4

Properties
Chemical formula	C_{23}H_{28}N_{2}O_{4}
Molar mass	396.487 g·mol^{−1}
- Except where otherwise noted, data are given for materials in their standard state (at 25 °C [77 °F], 100 kPa). Infobox references

Pleiocarpine is an anticholinergic alkaloid.
