= Pamicogrel =

Names
- Preferred IUPAC name Ethyl {2-[4,5-bis(4-methoxyphenyl)-1,3-thiazol-2-yl]-1H-pyrrol-1-yl}acetate
- Other names KB 3022, Paminate

Identifiers
CAS Number	101001-34-7
3D model (JSmol)	Interactive image
ChemSpider	59280
PubChem CID	65870
UNII	398FD8EDAL
CompTox Dashboard (EPA)	DTXSID4048804
- InChI: InChI=1S/C25H24N2O4S/c1-4-31-22(28)16-27-15-5-6-21(27)25-26-23(17-7-11-19(29-2)12-8-17)24(32-25)18-9-13-20(30-3)14-10-18/h5-15H,4,16H2,1-3H3 Key: ISCHOARKJADAKJ-UHFFFAOYSA-N; InChI=1/C25H24N2O4S/c1-4-31-22(28)16-27-15-5-6-21(27)25-26-23(17-7-11-19(29-2)12-8-17)24(32-25)18-9-13-20(30-3)14-10-18/h5-15H,4,16H2,1-3H3 Key: ISCHOARKJADAKJ-UHFFFAOYAC
- SMILES: CCOC(=O)CN1C=CC=C1C2=NC(=C(S2)C3=CC=C(C=C3)OC)C4=CC=C(C=C4)OC

Properties
Chemical formula	C_{25}H_{24}N_{2}O_{4}S
Molar mass	448.54 g·mol^{−1}
- Except where otherwise noted, data are given for materials in their standard state (at 25 °C [77 °F], 100 kPa). Infobox references

Pamicogrel is a cyclooxygenase inhibitor that was under development for its anti-platelet-aggregation effects.
