= Erythromycin/sulfafurazole =

Combination drug

Combination of
- Erythromycin: Macrolide antibiotic
- Sulfafurazole: Sulfonamide antibiotic

Clinical data
- Trade names: Pediazole
- Routes of administration: Oral

Legal status
- Legal status: US: ℞-only

Identifiers
- CAS Number: 376597-07-8

Erythromycin/sulfafurazole (trade name Pediazole) is a combination drug with the antibiotics erythromycin and sulfafurazole (the latter is also known as sulfisoxazole).

It is indicated in acute otitis media in children, particularly when Hemophilus influenzae is the suspected pathogen.
