= Nadoxolol =

Names
- IUPAC name N′,3-Dihydroxy-4-naphthalen-1-yloxybutanimidamide

Identifiers
CAS Number	54063-51-3; 35991-93-6 (hydrochloride)
3D model (JSmol)	Interactive image
ChemSpider	4886543
EC Number	252-825-2
MeSH	C006154
PubChem CID	6328253
UNII	SK43HU1689; RZ9G589EN2
CompTox Dashboard (EPA)	DTXSID90968903
- InChI: InChI=1S/C14H16N2O3/c15-14(16-18)8-11(17)9-19-13-7-3-5-10-4-1-2-6-12(10)13/h1-7,11,17-18H,8-9H2,(H2,15,16) Key: UPZVYDSBLFNMLK-UHFFFAOYSA-N; InChI=1/C14H16N2O3/c15-14(16-18)8-11(17)9-19-13-7-3-5-10-4-1-2-6-12(10)13/h1-7,11,17-18H,8-9H2,(H2,15,16) Key: UPZVYDSBLFNMLK-UHFFFAOYAW
- SMILES: C1=CC=C2C(=C1)C=CC=C2OCC(C/C(=N/O)/N)O

Properties
Chemical formula	C_{14}H_{16}N_{2}O_{3}
Molar mass	260.293 g·mol^{−1}
- Except where otherwise noted, data are given for materials in their standard state (at 25 °C [77 °F], 100 kPa). Infobox references

Nadoxolol is an antiarrhythmic agent (i.e., a drug for the treatment of irregular heartbeat), chemically related in structure to beta-adrenergic receptor blocker drugs such as propranolol.

It does not appear to be marketed anywhere in the world.
