= Pagibaximab =

Monoclonal antibody

Monoclonal antibody
- Type: Whole antibody
- Source: Chimeric (mouse/human)
- Target: staphylococcal lipoteichoic acid

Clinical data
- ATC code: none

Identifiers
- CAS Number: 595566-61-3
- ChemSpider: none
- UNII: 23KB56UHN9

Chemical and physical data
- Formula: C_{6462}H_{9996}N_{1728}O_{2028}S_{54}
- Molar mass: 146072.36 g·mol^{−1}

Pagibaximab is a chimeric monoclonal antibody for the prevention of staphylococcal sepsis in infants with low birth weight. As of March 2010, it is undergoing Phase II/III clinical trials.
