= Ivonescimab =

Monoclonal antibody

Monoclonal antibody
- Type: ?
- Source: Humanized (from hamster)
- Target: PD-1, VEGF-A

Clinical data
- Other names: AK112

Pharmacokinetic data
- Elimination half-life: 6-7 days

Identifiers
- CAS Number: 2428381-53-5
- PubChem SID: 472420269
- DrugBank: DB18931
- UNII: Y0O332CU66

Ivonescimab is a humanized bispecific monoclonal antibody currently being trialed for use against non-small-cell lung cancer. Developed by Akeso, it has been approved in China for the treatment of epidermal growth factor receptor-mutated locally advanced or metastatic non-squamous NSCLC in patients who have progressed past tyrosine kinase inhibitor therapy, and is undergoing clinical trials elsewhere.

== Mechanism of action ==
Ivonescimab prevents tumor proliferation and angiogenesis by inhibiting programmed cell death protein 1 and vascular endothelial growth factor A, respectively.

== Research ==
Ivonescimab so far has only completed trials in Chinese patients, and is currently undergoing phase III trials in the United States for the treatment of non-squamous non-small-cell lung cancer and advanced NSCLC.

== Society and culture ==
The initial success of ivonescimab in trials is compared to already-approved drugs such as Merck & Co.'s Keytruda (pembrolizumab); its success has been described as important for the pharmaceutical industry in China.

== See also ==
- Nivolumab
- Pembrolizumab
