= Pemivibart =

Monoclonal antibody for COVID-19

Monoclonal antibody
- Type: Whole antibody
- Source: Human
- Target: Spike protein of SARS-CoV-2

Clinical data
- Trade names: Pemgarda
- Other names: VYD222
- AHFS/Drugs.com: Monograph
- MedlinePlus: a624061
- License data: US DailyMed: Pemivibart
- Routes of administration: Intravenous
- ATC code: None

Legal status
- Legal status: US: ℞-only via EUA

Identifiers
- CAS Number: 2858673-18-2
- DrugBank: DB18720
- UNII: 557S3L3FAP
- KEGG: D12876

Pemivibart, sold under the brand name Pemgarda, is a monoclonal antibody medication authorized for the pre-exposure prophylaxis (prevention) of COVID‑19.

Pemivibart was developed by Invivyd.

The US Food and Drug Administration (FDA) issued an emergency use authorization for pemivibart in March 2024.

== Medical uses ==
In the US, pemivibart is authorized for the pre-exposure prophylaxis (prevention) of COVID-19 in people aged twelve years or older weighing at least 40 kilograms (88 lb). Pemivibart is authorized for individuals who are not currently infected with SARS-CoV-2—the virus that causes COVID-19—and have not been recently exposed to the virus. It is intended for individuals with moderate to severe immunocompromise due to a medical condition or immunosuppressive treatment, as they are less likely to respond effectively to SARS-CoV-2 vaccination.

In August 2024, the US Food and Drug Administration (FDA) revised the emergency use authorization for pemivibart to limit its use to when the combined national frequency of variants with substantially reduced susceptibility to pemivibart is less than or equal to 90%.

== Society and culture ==
=== Legal status ===
The US FDA issued an emergency use authorization for pemivibart in March 2024.

=== Names ===
Pemivibart is the international nonproprietary name.

== Research ==
VYD2311 is an investigational, updated pemivibart derivative developed to target newer SARS-CoV-2 variants and possibly administered via intramuscular or subcutaneous injection rather than intravenous infusion.
