= Provera =

Provera is an Italian surname. Notable people with the surname include:

- Giovanni Marchese di Provera (c.1736–1804), Italian general
- Marco Tronchetti Provera (born 1948), Italian businessman

== See also ==
- Medroxyprogesterone acetate, sold under the brand name Depo-Provera
