= Prodilidine =

Chemical compound

Clinical data
- ATC code: none

Identifiers
- IUPAC name: 1,2-dimethyl-3-phenylpyrrolidin-3-yl propionate
- CAS Number: 3734-17-6
- PubChem CID: 19514
- ChemSpider: 18388
- UNII: P67JPY18WD
- CompTox Dashboard (EPA): DTXSID30863261

Chemical and physical data
- Formula: C_{15}H_{21}NO_{2}
- Molar mass: 247.338 g·mol^{−1}
- 3D model (JSmol): Interactive image
- SMILES: CCC(=O)OC1(CCN(C1C)C)C2=CC=CC=C2
- InChI: InChI=1S/C15H21NO2/c1-4-14(17)18-15(10-11-16(3)12(15)2)13-8-6-5-7-9-13/h5-9,12H,4,10-11H2,1-3H3; Key:LUKSBMJXPCFBKO-UHFFFAOYSA-N

Prodilidine is an opioid analgesic which is a ring-contracted analogue of prodine. It has around the same analgesic efficacy as codeine, but is only around 1/3 the potency (100mg prodilidine is equivalent to 3mg oral morphine). It has little abuse potential.

== See also ==
- Profadol
