= Pazufloxacin =

Chemical compound

Clinical data
- AHFS/Drugs.com: International Drug Names
- ATC code: J01MA18 (WHO)

Identifiers
- IUPAC name: (3R)-10-(1-aminocyclopropyl)-9-fluoro-3-methyl-7-oxo-1H,7H- [1,3]oxazino[5,4,3-ij]quinoline-carboxylic acid
- CAS Number: 127045-41-4
- PubChem CID: 65957
- ChemSpider: 59360
- UNII: 4CZ1R38NDI
- CompTox Dashboard (EPA): DTXSID5046697
- ECHA InfoCard: 100.162.962

Chemical and physical data
- Formula: C_{16}H_{15}FN_{2}O_{4}
- Molar mass: 318.304 g·mol^{−1}
- 3D model (JSmol): Interactive image
- SMILES: C[C@H]1COC2=C3N1C=C(C(=O)C3=CC(=C2C4(CC4)N)F)C(=O)O
- InChI: InChI=1S/C16H15FN2O4/c1-7-6-23-14-11(16(18)2-3-16)10(17)4-8-12(14)19(7)5-9(13(8)20)15(21)22/h4-5,7H,2-3,6,18H2,1H3,(H,21,22)/t7-/m0/s1; Key:XAGMUUZPGZWTRP-ZETCQYMHSA-N

Pazufloxacin (INN) is a fluoroquinolone antibiotic. It is sold in Japan under the brand names Pasil and Pazucross.

== See also ==
- Quinolone antibiotic
