= Perzinfotel =

Chemical compound

Clinical data
- ATC code: none

Identifiers
- IUPAC name: 2-(8,9-Dioxo-2,6-diazabicyclo[5.2.0]non-1(7)-en-2-yl)ethylphosphonic acid
- CAS Number: 144912-63-0
- PubChem CID: 6918236
- DrugBank: DB12365
- ChemSpider: 5293443
- UNII: FX5AUU7Z8T
- KEGG: D05447
- CompTox Dashboard (EPA): DTXSID70162846
- ECHA InfoCard: 100.222.780

Chemical and physical data
- Formula: C_{9}H_{13}N_{2}O_{5}P
- Molar mass: 260.186 g·mol^{−1}
- 3D model (JSmol): Interactive image
- SMILES: C1CNC2=C(C(=O)C2=O)N(C1)CCP(=O)(O)O
- InChI: InChI=1S/C9H13N2O5P/c12-8-6-7(9(8)13)11(3-1-2-10-6)4-5-17(14,15)16/h10H,1-5H2,(H2,14,15,16); Key:BDABGOLMYNHHTR-UHFFFAOYSA-N

Perzinfotel (EAA-090) is a drug which acts as a potent NMDA antagonist. It has neuroprotective effects and has been investigated for the treatment of stroke, but lacks analgesic effects. Nevertheless, it shows a good safety profile compared to older drugs, although further development of this drug has been discontinued.

Prodrugs were developed since the oral bioavailability of perzinfotel is only around 3-5%.
