= Pritumumab =

Monoclonal antibody

Monoclonal antibody
- Type: Whole antibody
- Source: Human
- Target: vimentin

Clinical data
- ATC code: none

Identifiers
- CAS Number: 499212-74-7
- ChemSpider: none
- UNII: Z6Q90D1G53

Chemical and physical data
- Formula: C_{6440}H_{9968}N_{1708}O_{2016}S_{42}
- Molar mass: 144923.04 g·mol^{−1}

Pritumumab (PTB) is a human monoclonal antibody targeted against glioma. It works by binding to the ecto-domain of vimentin on the surface of cancer cells. developed by Nascent Biotech.

It is in clinical trials for the treatment of glioma. The FDA granted orphan drug designation in 2015.

The target of Pritumumab, cell surface vimentin, has been implicated in the replication of coronavirus, specifically in Severe acute respiratory syndrome coronavirus (SARS-CoV).

PTB has been proposed as a potential treatment for COVID-19 and related Viral Infections.
