= Cetamolol =

Names
- IUPAC name 2-[2-[3-(tert-Butylamino)-2-hydroxypropoxy]phenoxy]-N-methylacetamide

Identifiers
CAS Number	34919-98-7; 77590-95-5 (hydrochloride)
3D model (JSmol)	Interactive image
ChEMBL	ChEMBL2105989
ChemSpider	48483
KEGG	D03449
PubChem CID	53698
UNII	Z0VD1633O8; 5UNK5C6QM5 (hydrochloride)
CompTox Dashboard (EPA)	DTXSID20865739
- InChI: InChI=1S/C16H26N2O4/c1-16(2,3)18-9-12(19)10-21-13-7-5-6-8-14(13)22-11-15(20)17-4/h5-8,12,18-19H,9-11H2,1-4H3,(H,17,20) Key: UWCBNAVPISMFJZ-UHFFFAOYSA-N
- SMILES: CC(C)(C)NCC(COC1=CC=CC=C1OCC(=O)NC)O

Properties
Chemical formula	C_{16}H_{26}N_{2}O_{4}
Molar mass	310.394 g·mol^{−1}
- Except where otherwise noted, data are given for materials in their standard state (at 25 °C [77 °F], 100 kPa). Infobox references

Cetamolol is a beta adrenergic antagonist, more specifically a β_{1}-adrenergic blocker.

== Synthesis ==
Cetamolol synthesis:
