= Pargolol =

Names
- IUPAC name 1-(tert-Butylamino)-3-(2-prop-2-ynoxyphenoxy)propan-2-ol

Identifiers
CAS Number	47082-97-3
3D model (JSmol)	Interactive image
ChemSpider	61927
PubChem CID	68673
UNII	5OPO851W5L
CompTox Dashboard (EPA)	DTXSID80866126
- InChI: InChI=1S/C16H23NO3/c1-5-10-19-14-8-6-7-9-15(14)20-12-13(18)11-17-16(2,3)4/h1,6-9,13,17-18H,10-12H2,2-4H3 Key: UFNAECVCKNHAKN-UHFFFAOYSA-N; InChI=1/C16H23NO3/c1-5-10-19-14-8-6-7-9-15(14)20-12-13(18)11-17-16(2,3)4/h1,6-9,13,17-18H,10-12H2,2-4H3 Key: UFNAECVCKNHAKN-UHFFFAOYAZ
- SMILES: CC(C)(C)NCC(COC1=CC=CC=C1OCC#C)O

Properties
Chemical formula	C_{16}H_{23}NO_{3}
Molar mass	277.364 g·mol^{−1}
- Except where otherwise noted, data are given for materials in their standard state (at 25 °C [77 °F], 100 kPa). Infobox references

Pargolol is a beta adrenergic receptor antagonist.
