= Oryzin =

Class of enzymes

Identifiers
- EC no.: 3.4.21.63
- CAS no.: 2620433

Databases
- IntEnz: IntEnz view
- BRENDA: BRENDA entry
- ExPASy: NiceZyme view
- KEGG: KEGG entry
- MetaCyc: metabolic pathway
- PRIAM: profile
- PDB structures: RCSB PDB PDBe PDBsum
Search
- PMC: articles
- PubMed: articles
- NCBI: proteins

Oryzin (EC 3.4.21.63, Aspergillus alkaline proteinase, aspergillopeptidase B, API 21, aspergillopepsin B, aspergillopepsin F, Aspergillus candidus alkaline proteinase, Aspergillus flavus alkaline proteinase, Aspergillus melleus semi-alkaline proteinase, Aspergillus oryzae alkaline proteinase, Aspergillus parasiticus alkaline proteinase, Aspergillus serine proteinase, Aspergillus sydowi alkaline proteinase, Aspergillus soya alkaline proteinase, Aspergillus melleus alkaline proteinase, Aspergillus sulphureus alkaline proteinase, prozyme, P 5380, kyorinase, seaprose S, semi-alkaline protease, sumizyme MP, prozyme 10, onoprose, onoprose SA, protease P, promelase) is an enzyme. This enzyme catalyses the following chemical reaction

Hydrolysis of proteins with broad specificity, and of Bz-Arg-OEt > Ac-Tyr-OEt. Does not hydrolyse peptide amides

This enzyme is a predominant extracellular alkaline endopeptidase of the mold Aspergillus oryzae.
