= Prazitone =

Chemical compound

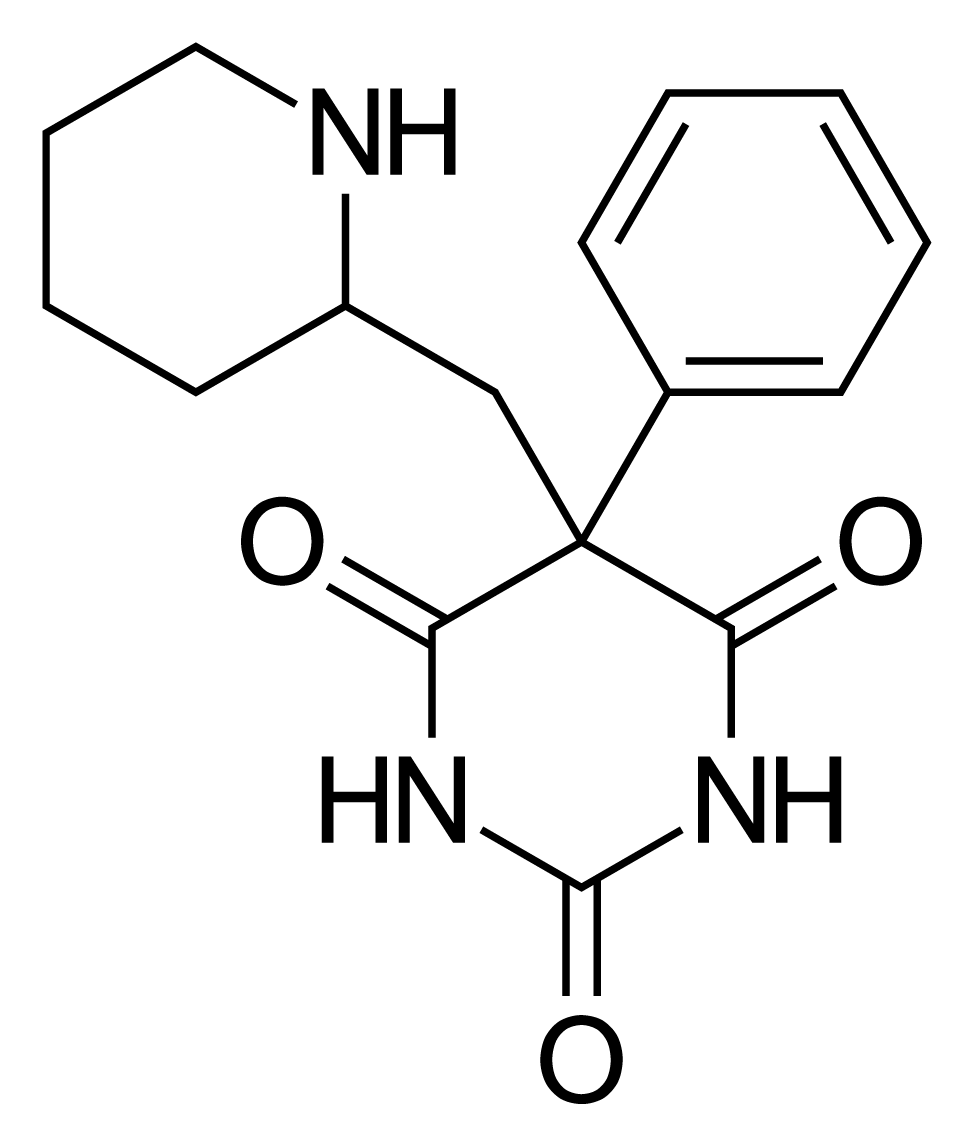

Clinical data
- Other names: AGN-511; 5-Phenyl-5-(2-piperidylmethyl)barbituric acid
- ATC code: none

Identifiers
- IUPAC name: 5-phenyl-5-(piperidin-2-ylmethyl)pyrimidine-2,4,6(1H,3H,5H)-trione
- CAS Number: 2409-26-9
- PubChem CID: 3050417
- ChemSpider: 2312482
- UNII: 6DZB018428
- CompTox Dashboard (EPA): DTXSID80862926

Chemical and physical data
- Formula: C_{16}H_{19}N_{3}O_{3}
- Molar mass: 301.346 g·mol^{−1}
- 3D model (JSmol): Interactive image
- SMILES: C1CCNC(C1)CC2(C(=O)NC(=O)NC2=O)C3=CC=CC=C3
- InChI: InChI=1S/C16H19N3O3/c20-13-16(11-6-2-1-3-7-11,14(21)19-15(22)18-13)10-12-8-4-5-9-17-12/h1-3,6-7,12,17H,4-5,8-10H2,(H2,18,19,20,21,22); Key:UGZAKKMLMJITLL-UHFFFAOYSA-N

Prazitone (INN, BAN; developmental code name AGN-511) is a barbiturate derivative described as an antidepressant which was developed in the 1960s. Unlike most barbiturates, it has little or no sedative effects, instead acting as a non-sedating anxiolytic and antidepressant. The dosage range in humans is around 200–600 mg, although higher doses have been used in trials for the treatment of depression associated with Parkinson's disease.
