= Profenamine =

Chemical compound

Clinical data
- Trade names: Parsidol, Parsidan, Parkisol, Parkin
- AHFS/Drugs.com: International Drug Names
- ATC code: N04AA05 (WHO)

Pharmacokinetic data
- Protein binding: 93%
- Elimination half-life: 1 to 2 hours

Identifiers
- IUPAC name: N,N-Diethyl-1-(10H-phenothiazin-10-yl)propan-2-amine
- CAS Number: 522-00-9
- PubChem CID: 3290
- IUPHAR/BPS: 7181
- DrugBank: DB00392
- ChemSpider: 3174
- UNII: 7WI4P02YN1
- ChEBI: CHEBI:313639
- ChEMBL: ChEMBL1206
- CompTox Dashboard (EPA): DTXSID2023018
- ECHA InfoCard: 100.007.566

Chemical and physical data
- Formula: C_{19}H_{24}N_{2}S
- Molar mass: 312.48 g·mol^{−1}
- 3D model (JSmol): Interactive image
- SMILES: S2c1ccccc1N(c3c2cccc3)CC(N(CC)CC)C
- InChI: InChI=1S/C19H24N2S/c1-4-20(5-2)15(3)14-21-16-10-6-8-12-18(16)22-19-13-9-7-11-17(19)21/h6-13,15H,4-5,14H2,1-3H3; Key:CDOZDBSBBXSXLB-UHFFFAOYSA-N

Profenamine (INN; also known as ethopropazine (BAN); sold under the trade name Parsidol and others) is a phenothiazine derivative used as an antiparkinsonian agent that has anticholinergic, antihistamine, and antiadrenergic actions. It is also used in the alleviation of the extrapyramidal syndrome induced by drugs such as other phenothiazine compounds, but, like other compounds with antimuscarinic properties, is of no value against tardive dyskinesia.

== Synthesis ==
For promoting bone growth:

Synthesis: Patents:

The alkylation between phenothiazine [92-84-2] (1) and 1-Diethylamino-2-chloropropane [761-21-7] (2) in the presence of Sodium amide gives ethopropazine (3).

- The aziridinium salt helps to rationalize why a rearrangement product is observed (ala methadone). This was also observewd for Aceprometazine.
