= Pamatolol =

Names
- IUPAC name Methyl N-[2-[4-[2-hydroxy-3-(propan-2-ylamino)propoxy]phenyl]ethyl]carbamate

Identifiers
CAS Number	59110-35-9
3D model (JSmol)	Interactive image
ChemSpider	39320
PubChem CID	43150
UNII	20G2S6V53L
CompTox Dashboard (EPA)	DTXSID30866737
- InChI: InChI=1S/C16H26N2O4/c1-12(2)18-10-14(19)11-22-15-6-4-13(5-7-15)8-9-17-16(20)21-3/h4-7,12,14,18-19H,8-11H2,1-3H3,(H,17,20) Key: UGENBJKPPGFFAT-UHFFFAOYSA-N; InChI=1/C16H26N2O4/c1-12(2)18-10-14(19)11-22-15-6-4-13(5-7-15)8-9-17-16(20)21-3/h4-7,12,14,18-19H,8-11H2,1-3H3,(H,17,20) Key: UGENBJKPPGFFAT-UHFFFAOYAH
- SMILES: CC(C)NCC(COC1=CC=C(C=C1)CCNC(=O)OC)O

Properties
Chemical formula	C_{16}H_{26}N_{2}O_{4}
Molar mass	310.394 g·mol^{−1}
- Except where otherwise noted, data are given for materials in their standard state (at 25 °C [77 °F], 100 kPa). Infobox references

Pamatolol is a beta adrenergic receptor antagonist.
