= Phetharbital =

Chemical compound

Clinical data
- Other names: Phetharbital
- ATC code: none

Identifiers
- IUPAC name: 1-Phenyl-5,5-diethyl-1,3-diazinane-2,4,6-trione
- CAS Number: 357-67-5
- PubChem CID: 9650
- ChemSpider: 9271
- UNII: 52HG53W51E
- CompTox Dashboard (EPA): DTXSID30189216
- ECHA InfoCard: 100.006.015

Chemical and physical data
- Formula: C_{14}H_{16}N_{2}O_{3}
- Molar mass: 260.293 g·mol^{−1}
- 3D model (JSmol): Interactive image
- SMILES: c2ccccc2N(C1=O)C(=O)NC(=O)C1(CC)CC
- InChI: InChI=1S/C14H16N2O3/c1-3-14(4-2)11(17)15-13(19)16(12(14)18)10-8-6-5-7-9-10/h5-9H,3-4H2,1-2H3,(H,15,17,19); Key:ILORKHQGIMGDFN-UHFFFAOYSA-N

Phetharbital (phenetharbital) is a barbiturate derivative. It has anticonvulsant effects and relatively weak sedative action, and is considered to have a low abuse potential.
