= Pacrinolol =

Names
- IUPAC name (E)-3-[4-[3-[2-(3,4-Dimethoxyphenyl)ethylamino]-2-hydroxypropoxy]phenyl]but-2-enenitrile

Identifiers
CAS Number	65655-59-6
3D model (JSmol)	Interactive image; Interactive image
ChemSpider	4940772
PubChem CID	6436098
UNII	CHE211JZXQ
CompTox Dashboard (EPA)	DTXSID701024357
- InChI: InChI=1S/C23H28N2O4/c1-17(10-12-24)19-5-7-21(8-6-19)29-16-20(26)15-25-13-11-18-4-9-22(27-2)23(14-18)28-3/h4-10,14,20,25-26H,11,13,15-16H2,1-3H3/b17-10+ Key: BMAJJBHGPUHERB-LICLKQGHSA-N; InChI=1/C23H28N2O4/c1-17(10-12-24)19-5-7-21(8-6-19)29-16-20(26)15-25-13-11-18-4-9-22(27-2)23(14-18)28-3/h4-10,14,20,25-26H,11,13,15-16H2,1-3H3/b17-10+ Key: BMAJJBHGPUHERB-LICLKQGHBO
- SMILES: N#C\C=C(\c2ccc(OCC(O)CNCCc1cc(OC)c(OC)cc1)cc2)C; C/C(=C\C#N)/C1=CC=C(C=C1)OCC(CNCCC2=CC(=C(C=C2)OC)OC)O

Properties
Chemical formula	C_{23}H_{28}N_{2}O_{4}
Molar mass	396.487 g·mol^{−1}
- Except where otherwise noted, data are given for materials in their standard state (at 25 °C [77 °F], 100 kPa). Infobox references

Pacrinolol is a beta adrenergic receptor antagonist.
