= Tapentadol =

Opioid analgesic of benzenoid class

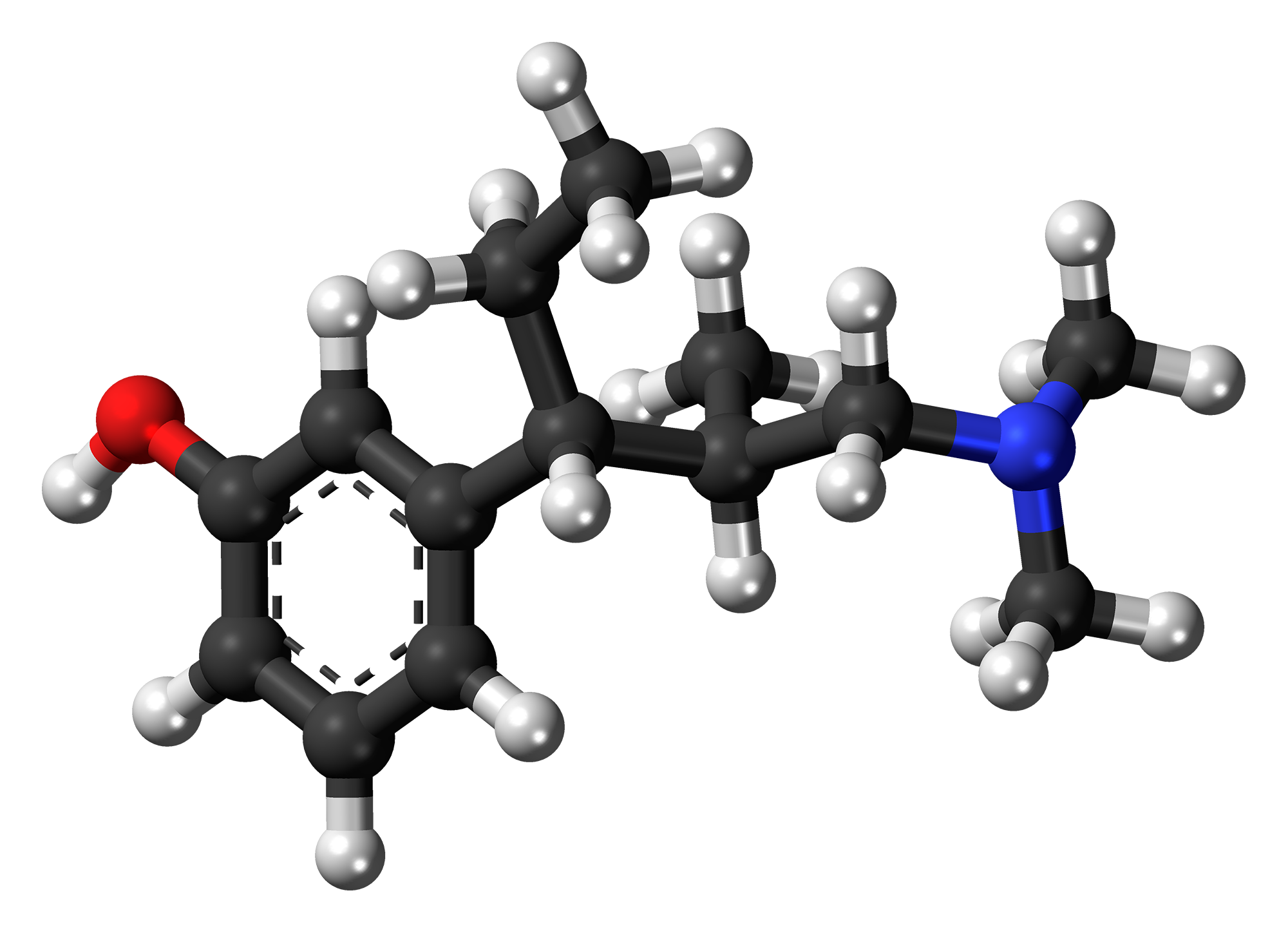

Clinical data
- Trade names: Nucynta, Palexia, Yantil, Tapenta, Tapal, Aspadol, others
- Other names: BN-200; CG-5503; R-331333
- AHFS/Drugs.com: Monograph
- MedlinePlus: a610006
- Pregnancy category: AU: C
- Dependence liability: High
- Addiction liability: High
- Routes of administration: By mouth
- Drug class: Opioid
- ATC code: N02AX06 (WHO)

Legal status
- Legal status: AU: S8 (Controlled drug); BR: Class A1 (Narcotic drugs); CA: Schedule I; DE: Anlage III (Special prescription form required); UK: Class A (Schedule 2 CD); US: Schedule II; UN: Unscheduled; EU: Rx-only; SE: Förteckning II In general: ℞ (Prescription only)

Pharmacokinetic data
- Bioavailability: 32% (oral)
- Protein binding: 20%
- Metabolism: Hepatic (mostly via glucuronidation but also by CYP2C9, CYP2C19, CYP2D6)
- Onset of action: ~30 minutes
- Elimination half-life: 4 hours
- Duration of action: 4-6 hours
- Excretion: Urine and faeces (1%)

Identifiers
- IUPAC name: 3-[(1R,2R)-3-(Dimethylamino)-1-ethyl-2-methylpropyl]phenol
- CAS Number: 175591-23-8; HCl: 175591-09-0
- PubChem CID: 9838022
- IUPHAR/BPS: 7477
- DrugBank: DB06204
- ChemSpider: 8013742
- UNII: H8A007M585; HCl: 71204KII53
- KEGG: D06007
- ChEMBL: ChEMBL1201776
- CompTox Dashboard (EPA): DTXSID30170003
- ECHA InfoCard: 100.131.247

Chemical and physical data
- Formula: C_{14}H_{23}NO
- Molar mass: 221.344 g·mol^{−1}
- 3D model (JSmol): Interactive image
- Boiling point: (decomposes)
- SMILES: Oc1cc(ccc1)[C@@H]([C@@H](C)CN(C)C)CC
- InChI: InChI=1S/C14H23NO/c1-5-14(11(2)10-15(3)4)12-7-6-8-13(16)9-12/h6-9,11,14,16H,5,10H2,1-4H3/t11-,14+/m0/s1; Key:KWTWDQCKEHXFFR-SMDDNHRTSA-N

Tapentadol, sold under the brand names Nucynta and Palexia among others, is a synthetic opioid analgesic with a dual mode of action as a highly selective full agonist of the μ-opioid receptor and as a norepinephrine reuptake inhibitor (NRI). Tapentadol is used medically for the treatment of moderate to severe pain. It is highly addictive and is a commonly abused drug.

Frequently reported adverse effects include euphoria, constipation, nausea, vomiting, headaches, loss of appetite, drowsiness, dizziness, itching, dry mouth, and sweating. More severe adverse reactions can occur, including addiction and dependence, substance abuse, respiratory depression, and an elevated risk of serotonin syndrome. Concurrent use of tapendatol with serotonergic drugs can heighten the risk of excessive serotonin accumulation while concurrent use with CNS depressants — alcohol, benzodiazepines, other opioids — can heighten the risk of profound sedation, dangerously slowed breathing, and death.

Analgesia occurs within 32 minutes of oral administration, and lasts for 4–6 hours. Tapentadol is taken by mouth, and is available in immediate-release and controlled-release formulations. Tapentadol's combined mechanism of action is often compared to that of tramadol. Unlike tramadol, tapentadol is not metabolised by cytochrome P450 enzymes, but rather through glucuronidation. Due to this, tapentadol has fewer interactions with other medications and fewer side effects when compared with tramadol.

Like tramadol, tapentadol affects both the opioid system and the norepinephrine system to relieve pain. Unlike tramadol, it has only weak effects on the reuptake of serotonin and is a significantly more potent opioid with no known active metabolites. The potency of tapentadol is somewhere between that of tramadol and morphine, with an analgesic efficacy comparable to that of oxycodone despite a lower incidence of side effects. The CDC Opioid Guidelines Calculator estimates a conversion rate of 50mg of tapentadol equaling 10 mg of oral oxycodone in terms of opioid receptor activation.

In the late 1980s, Grünenthal developed tapentadol to improve on tramadol, which they had created in 1962. Their goal was to design a molecule that minimized serotonin activity, strongly activated the μ-opioid receptor, inhibited norepinephrine reuptake, and worked without metabolic activation. The result was tapentadol. Due to the high risk of addiction, substance misuse, and dependence, tapentadol is a Schedule II controlled substance in the United States, a Schedule 8 controlled drug in Australia,, a Schedule 1 drug in Canada, and a Class A controlled substance in the United Kingdom.

== Medical use ==
Tapentadol is used for the treatment of moderate to severe pain for both acute (following e.g. injury or surgery) and chronic musculoskeletal pain. It is also specifically indicated for controlling the pain of diabetic neuropathy when around-the-clock opioid medication is required.

Extended-release formulations of tapentadol are not indicated for use in the management of acute pain and are instead indicated only for the relief of severe, disabling pain, that is long-term in nature and cannot be controlled by any other pharmacological means.

Tapentadol is pregnancy category C. There are no adequate and well-controlled studies of tapentadol in pregnant women, and tapentadol is not recommended for use in women during and immediately prior to labor and delivery.

There are no adequate and well-controlled studies of tapentadol in children.

== Contraindications ==
Tapentadol is contraindicated in people with epilepsy or who are otherwise prone to seizures. It raises intracranial pressure so should not be used in people with head injuries, brain tumors, or other conditions which increase intracranial pressure. It increases the risk of respiratory depression so should not be used in people with asthma.

As with other μ-opioid agonists, tapentadol may cause spasms of the sphincter of Oddi, and is therefore discouraged for use in patients with biliary tract disease such as both acute and chronic pancreatitis. People who are rapid or ultra rapid metabolizers for the CYP2C9, CYP2C19, and CYP2D6 enzymes may not respond adequately to tapentadol therapy. Due to reduced clearance, tapentadol should be administered with caution to people with moderate liver disease and not at all in people with severe liver disease.

== Adverse effects ==
The most commonly reported side effects of tapentadol therapy are constipation, nausea, vomiting, headaches, loss of appetite, drowsiness, dizziness, itching, dry mouth, and sweating. Tapentadol has also been noted to induce feelings of relaxation and euphoria, and it may cause serious side effects such as respiratory depression, serotonin syndrome, addiction and substance dependence.

Several studies have found that tapentadol causes less constipation and nausea compared with oxycodone. It has been noted that due to this, treatment adherence may be improved, with fewer people discontinuing tapentadol (when compared with oxycodone).

Tapentadol has been demonstrated to reduce the seizure threshold in patients. Tapentadol should be used cautiously in patients with a history of seizures, and in patients who are also taking one or more other drugs which have also been demonstrated to reduce the seizure threshold. Patients at high risk include those using other serotogenic and adrenergic medications, as well as patients with head trauma, metabolic disorders, and those in alcohol and/or drug withdrawals.

Tapentadol has been demonstrated to potentially produce hypotension (low blood pressure), and should be used with caution in patients with low blood pressure, and patients who are taking one or more other medications which are also known to reduce blood pressure.

=== Addiction and abuse ===
The World Health Organization determined that there was little evidence to judge the abuse potential of tapentadol when it was introduced. Although early pre-clinical animal trials suggested that tapentadol had a reduced abuse liability compared to other opioid analgesics, the US Drug Enforcement Agency placed tapentadol into Schedule II, the same category as stronger opioids more commonly used recreationally, such as morphine, oxycodone, and fentanyl. Since these initial trials, however, evidence has shown that tapentadol is commonly abused, misused and diverted, that it is addictive, and that it poses a high risk of physical and/or mental dependence.

Given that tapentadol is a highly selective full agonist of the μ-opioid receptor, and given that is not a pro-drug, with no ceiling effect, studies have found that it is significantly more abusable than tramadol, and similar to hydrocodone and other full agonists of the μ-opioid receptor (such as oxycodone and hydromorphone) in terms of addiction and dependence liability. Tapentadol is water soluble, which creates the potential for further abuse of the drug. There have been reports of users crushing, chewing, inhaling or injecting immediate-release tapentadol tablets, which can lead to respiratory depression, and death.

=== Dependence and withdrawal ===
The risk of experiencing severe withdrawal symptoms is high if a patient has become physically or mentally dependent and discontinues tapentadol abruptly. These symptoms can range from mild discomfort to more serious health issues, making abrupt cessation dangerous. When a person has been using tapentadol regularly for an extended period of time, tapering off the drug gradually is generally recommended. This approach allows the body to adjust to lower doses over time, minimizing the risk of withdrawal symptoms and ensuring a safer transition away from tapentadol. Gradual withdrawal helps to avoid the shock to the system that comes with abrupt discontinuation, ultimately making the process more manageable for a person who has developed a dependence.

The symptoms of tapentadol withdrawal are typical of other opioids and can include anxiety, restlessness, fever or chills, joint pain, nausea or vomiting, loss of appetite, runny nose, stomach cramps, sweating, tremor, or insomnia.

However, tapentadol withdrawal symptoms may be more intense and prolonged when compared with more typical opioids such as codeine or oxycodone, in some respects, due to the fact that tapentadol acts also as norepinephrine reuptake inhibitor (NRI). People withdrawing from a tapentadol dependency may experience both typical opioid withdrawal symptoms, such as fever or nausea, along with symptoms associated more commonly with the discontinuation of drugs which block the reuptake of norepinephrine.

== Interactions ==
Combination with selective serotonin reuptake inhibitors, serotonin–norepinephrine reuptake inhibitors, serotonin releasing agents, and serotonin receptor agonists may lead to potentially lethal serotonin syndrome. Combination with MAOIs may also result in an adrenergic storm. Use of tapentadol with alcohol or other central nervous system depressants such as benzodiazepines, barbiturates, nonbenzodiazepines, phenothiazines, gabapentinoids and other opiates may result in increased impairment, sedation, respiratory depression, and death.

Tapentadol is partially metabolized by the hepatic enzymes CYP2C9, CYP2C19, and CYP2D6 so it innately has interactions with drugs that enhance or repress the activity/expression of one or more of these enzymes, as well as with substrates of these enzymes (due to competition for the enzyme); some enzyme mediators/substrates require dosing adjustments to one or both medications.

The combination of tapentadol and alcohol may result in increased plasma concentrations of tapentadol and produce respiratory depression to a degree greater than the sum of the two drugs when administered separately; patients should be cautioned against alcohol consumption when taking tapentadol as the combination may be fatal.

Tapentadol should be used with caution in patients who are taking one or more anticholinergic drugs, as this combination may result in urine retention (which can result in serious renal damage and is considered a medical emergency).

== Pharmacology ==
=== Pharmacodynamics ===
Tapentadol is a synthetic opioid with a dual mechanism of action: it acts as a full agonist of the μ-opioid receptor (MOR) and as a norepinephrine reuptake inhibitor (NRI). This unique pharmacological profile allows it to treat both nociceptive and neuropathic pain, and it is theorised that the effects on norepinephrine are a substantial benefit for people taking it. Tapentadol does not affect serotonin, unlike tramadol, which prevents the reuptake of serotonin and norepinephrine, similarly to certain antidepressants known as serotonin–norepinephrine reuptake inhibitors (SNRIs), such as desvenlafaxine and duloxetine.

Tapentadol exhibits high binding selectivity and affinity for MOR, which is the principal target of the endogenous neuropeptide β-endorphin. It has significantly lower affinity for the δ-opioid receptor (DOR), κ-opioid receptor (KOR) and M1 as an antimuscarinic effect.

MOR binding sites are distributed throughout the human brain, with higher densities in regions such as the amygdala, hypothalamus, thalamus, nucleus caudatus, putamen, and select cortical areas.

Opioids like tapentadol are believed to mediate analgesia primarily through MOR activation in the midbrain periaqueductal gray (PAG) and rostral ventromedial medulla (RVM), thereby inhibiting ascending pain pathways. MOR activation in the intestine contributes to common opioid-related side effects such as constipation.

As noted, tapentadol is structurally similar to tramadol, and both drugs utilize a dual mechanism involving the opioid and norepinephrine systems. However, unlike tramadol, tapentadol exerts minimal influence on serotonin reuptake and is approximately 2–3 times more potent as an opioid. Tapentadol also lacks active metabolites, which distinguishes it from tramadol and may contribute to a more predictable pharmacokinetic profile.

=== Pharmacokinetics ===
Following oral administration, tapentadol typically provides onset of analgesia within 32 minutes, with effects lasting approximately 4 to 6 hours. Approximately 32% of an oral dose of tapentadol escapes first-pass metabolism in the liver, entering systemic circulation to exert pharmacological effects on both the central nervous system (CNS) and peripheral nervous system (PNS).

The free base conversion factor for tapentadol hydrochloride is 0.86. Food intake has a minor impact on the drug's peak plasma concentration: increasing it by approximately 8% for immediate-release (IR) and 18% for extended-release (ER) formulations. These differences are not clinically significant, and tapentadol may be taken with or without food.

Tapentadol displays dose-dependent plasma concentrations; however, higher doses (e.g., 250 mg) may produce disproportionately elevated Cmax values relative to lower doses, suggesting non-linear pharmacokinetics at higher concentrations.

In receptor binding studies, tapentadol demonstrated a Ki of 60 nM for cloned human μ-opioid receptors, with strong agonist activity comparable to morphine, as measured by [35S]GTPγS binding assays. Its inhibitory effect on norepinephrine reuptake (Ki = 480 nM) complements its opioid activity, while its weak serotonergic effects distinguish it from dual-acting agents like tramadol. In vitro studies using human tissue indicate that tapentadol has approximately one-third the binding affinity of morphine for the human μ-opioid receptor, reflecting its comparatively lower opioid potency. Nonetheless, it retains clinically meaningful opioid activity, contributing to its analgesic effects.

Commercial formulations contain only the (R,R)-stereoisomer. Drugs with high MOR affinity, such as tapentadol, carry an abuse potential comparable to other strong opioids like morphine, oxycodone, and hydromorphone.

== History ==
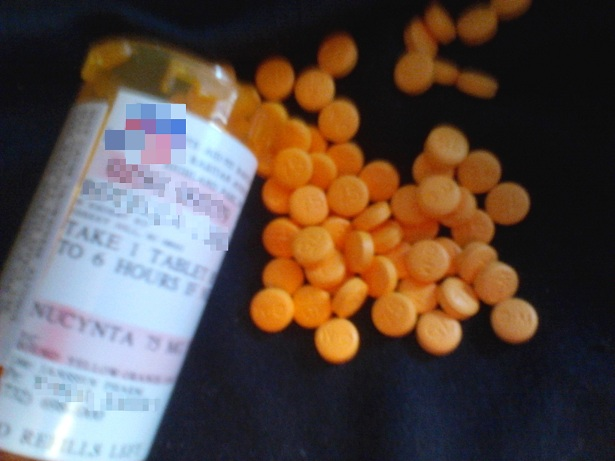
75 mg Nucynta (tapentadol) tablets

Tapentadol was invented at the German pharmaceutical company Grünenthal in the late 1980s led by Helmut Buschmann; the team started by analyzing the chemistry and activity of tramadol, which had been invented at the same company in 1962.

Tramadol has several enantiomers, and each forms metabolites after processing in the liver. These tramadol variants have varying activities at the μ-opioid receptor, the norepinephrine transporter, and the serotonin transporter, and differing half-lives, with the metabolites having the best activity. Using tramadol as a starting point, the team aimed to discover a single molecule that minimized the serotonin activity, had strong μ-opioid receptor agonism and strong norepinephrine reuptake inhibition, and would not require metabolism to be active; the result was tapentadol.

In 2003 Grünenthal partnered with two Johnson & Johnson subsidiaries, Johnson & Johnson Pharmaceutical Research and Development and Ortho-McNeil Pharmaceutical to develop and market tapentadol; Johnson & Johnson had exclusive rights to sell the drug in the US, Canada, and Japan while Grünenthal retained rights elsewhere. In 2008 tapentadol received approval by the US Food and Drug Administration; in 2009 it was classified by US Drug Enforcement Agency as a Schedule II drug, and entered the US market. Tapentadol was reported to be the "first new molecular entity of oral centrally acting analgesics" class approved in the United States in more than 25 years.

In 2010 Grünenthal granted Johnson & Johnson the right to market tapentadol in about 80 additional countries. Later that year, tapentadol was approved in Europe. In 2011, Nucynta ER, an extended release formulation of tapentadol, was released in the United States for management of moderate to severe chronic pain and received Food and Drug Administration approval the following year for the treatment of neuropathic pain associated with diabetic peripheral neuropathy.

After annual sales of $166 million, in January 2015, Johnson & Johnson sold its rights to market tapentadol in the US to Depomed for $1 billion. The drug was manufactured at a plant located on the island of Puerto Rico that was hit by Hurricane Maria in 2017 causing a major shortage in the drug's availability. In January 2018 Depomed sold off the manufacturing of the drug and licensed it to Collegium Pharmaceutical for $10 million up front with an annual royalty payment of a minimum $135 million for the next 4 years. This combination of events has caused additional short supply of the drug leaving patients who depend on it to seek alternative treatments.

== Abuse and controls ==
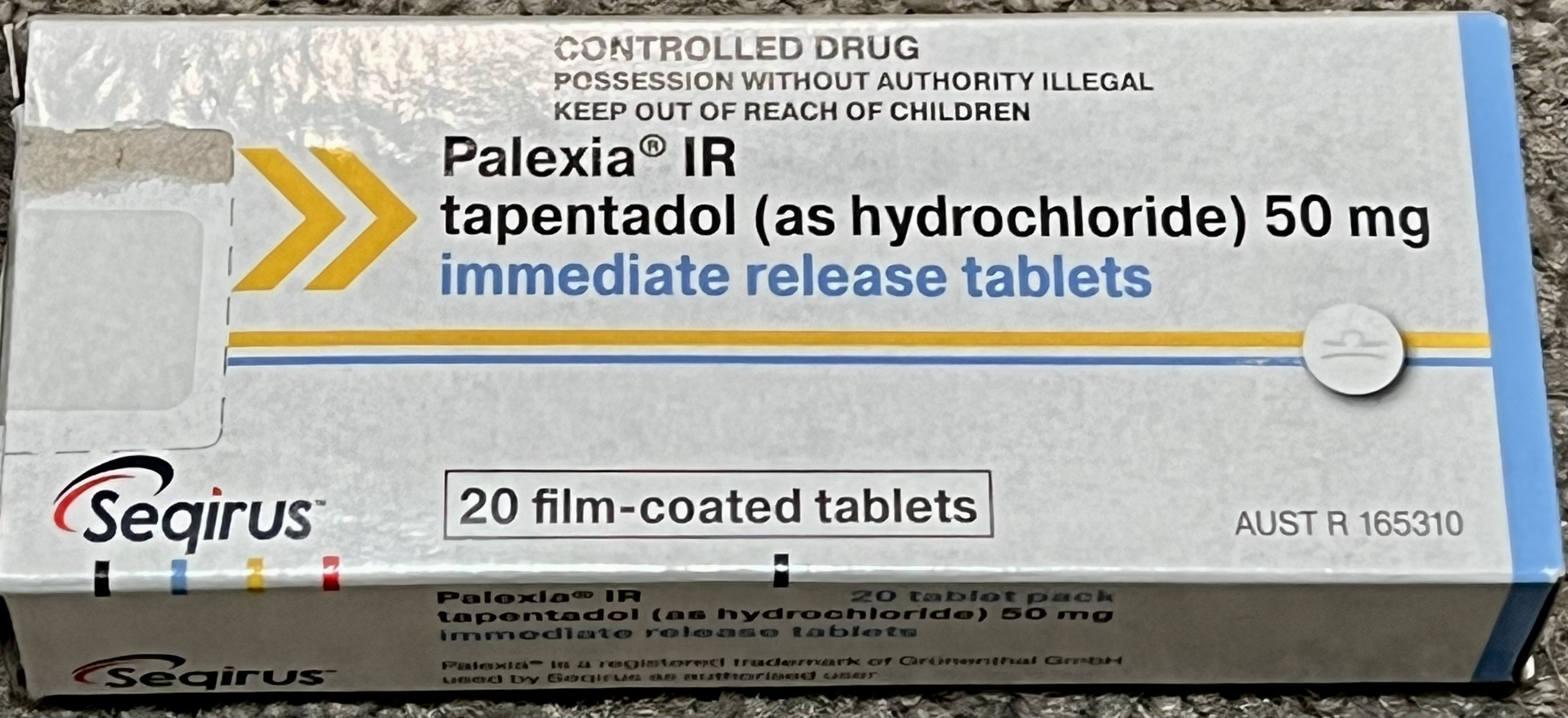
Palexia IR 50mg with Australian "controlled drug" warning

There have been calls for tapentadol to be only marketed in countries where appropriate controls exist, but after performing a critical review, the United Nations Expert Committee on Drug Dependence in 2014 advised that tapentadol not be placed under international control but remain under surveillance.

As mentioned, the enhanced potency of tapentadol makes it considerably more susceptible to abuse compared to other opioids. This increased potency is one of the key factors that contribute to its higher potential for misuse. Furthermore, tapentadol is water soluble, which allows for a variety of methods to ingest or administer the drug. It can be snorted, inhaled, or even delivered rectally, all of which significantly increase the risk of abuse and the potential for dangerous consequences. These factors combined make tapentadol a particularly risky substance when it comes to misuse, posing serious concerns for both individuals and public health.

The FDA's Controlled Substance Staff (CSS) recognizes that tapentadol is available as an immediate-release formula, and that in the past there was no requirement of a medication guide for immediate-release opioids. However, tapentadol exhibits several distinctive properties that makes it highly abusable. According to them:

1. Tapentadol is a novel opioid that displays high affinity and selectivity for the μ-opioid receptor;
2. In a human liability pharmacology study conducted by the sponsor, it was found that tapentadol displays a high abuse potential similar to hydromorphone, a controlled substance with a similar risk of abuse, misuse and diversion; and
3. Based on a human abuse liability study, 50 mg of tapentadol produces comparable opioid effects to that of 4 mg of hydromorphone.

Since 2009 the drug has been categorized in the US as a Schedule II Controlled Substance with ACSCN 9780; in 2014 it was allocated a 17,500 kg aggregate manufacturing quota.

In 2010, Australia made tapentadol a S8 controlled drug. The following year, tapentadol was classified as a Class A controlled drug in the United Kingdom, and was also placed under national control in Cyprus, Estonia, Finland, Greece, Latvia and Spain.

More recently, Canada made the opioid a Schedule I controlled drug, putting it in the same class as other prescription opioids such as morphine, fentanyl, tramadol, and heroin.

In India (except the state of Punjab), multiple brands of tapentadol remain available over the counter. Recent reports have suggested increasing tapentadol abuse and dependence in India, where users have improvised injections with 50 and 100 mg tablets. Furthermore, a large number of listings for tapentadol sourced from India can be found internationally on illicit marketplaces on the dark web. There have been several reports of tapentadol from Indian pharmacies being smuggled to the US, the EU, and Bangladesh, where they are distributed via the black market.

== Veterinary use ==
Tapentadol has been demonstrated as a potentially effective analgesic in experimental studies however, further research is needed before it can be recommended for clinical use. Tapentadol is mainly metabolized as tapentadol-O-glucuronide in dogs and tapentadol-O-sulfate in cats. Intravenous, but not oral, administration has been shown to be effective in the dog, inducing sedation, salivation, ataxia, diarrhoea, and thermal antinociception. In cats intravenous, intramuscular, and subcutaenous administration has resulted in mild sedation and salivation. IV produced longer and greater sedation in the cat than IM and SC.
