= C22H28NO3 =

The molecular formula C_{22}H_{28}NO3 (C_{22}H_{28}NO_{3}^{+}, molar mass: 354.46 g/mol) may refer to:

- Benzilone, an antimuscarinic
- Bevonium, an antimuscarinic
- Pipenzolate
