= Kenneth Binmoeller =

German gastroenterologist

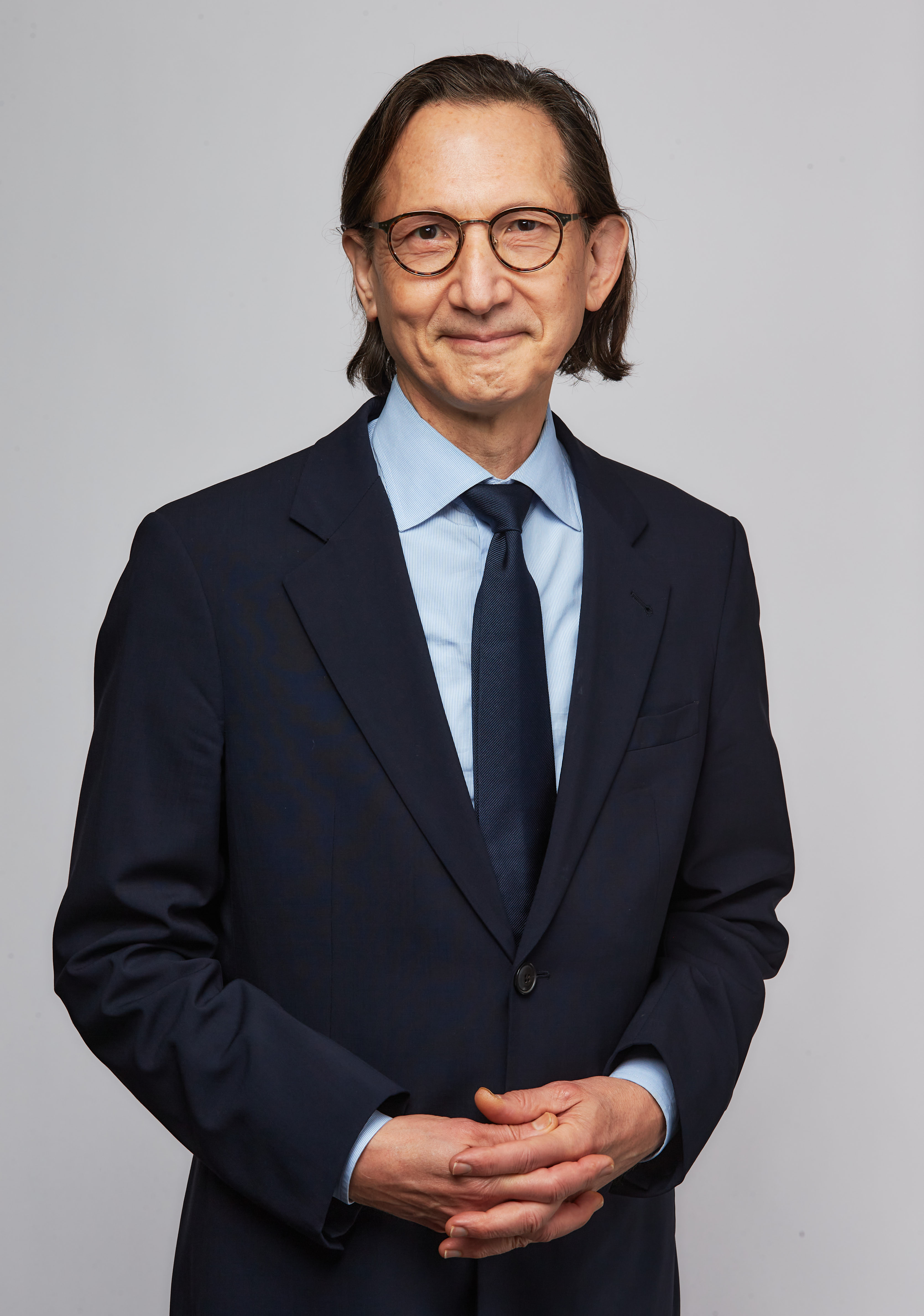
- Photo of Dr. Kenneth Binmoeller
- Education: Albert Ludwigs University; University of Bern
- Occupation: Surgeon
- Known for: lumen-apposing metal stent (LAMS); AXIOS
- Medical career
- Field: Gastroenterology
- Institutions: California Pacific Medical Center
- Awards: ACG Master Endoscopist of the Year (2013); Da Vinci Award for Endoscopy (2019); ASGE Rudolf Schindler Award (2026)
- Website: Kenneth Binmoeller on LinkedIn

Kenneth Frank Binmoeller is a medical doctor and author of multiple scientific contributions and over 300 publications, as well as the inventor of the lumen-apposing metal stent (LAMS) and AXIOS System. These are medical devices used to relieve blockages while creating a direct connection between two bodily structures. He practices in the field of Gastroenterology with a specialty of Advanced Endoscopic Intervention. Binmoeller has been published for his innovations in medical devices and training in the field of Endoscopy.

== Education and training ==
Binmoeller studied Medicine at the Albert Ludwigs University and graduated in 1983 before he attended medical school at the University of Freiburg in Germany and then at the University of Bern in Switzerland. He completed his Residency in Internal Medicine at the Baylor College of Medicine in Houston, Texas, and followed his residency by working as an attending physician in Honokaa, Hawaii while at Hamakua Medical Center, Honokaa Hospital. Binmoeller then completed a Fellowship in Gastroenterology at the Oregon Health & Science University in Portland. Having completed his fellowship, Binmoeller joined the University Hospital (Hôpital Cimiez) at Cimiez in Nice, France.

In 1991, Binmoeller was recruited by and mentored under Dr. Nib Soehendra, known for numerous contributions as a pioneer in the field of therapeutic endoscopy, while at the University Hospital Eppendorf in Hamburg. Binmoeller served as Deputy Director and Senior Consultant in the Department of Endoscopic Surgery.

== Career ==
Binmoeller relocated back to the United States after seven years in Hamburg, taking the position of Director of Endoscopy at the University of California at San Diego (UCSD) while holding a joint appointment as Associate Professor of Medicine and Science. Binmoeller is certified in gastroenterology and internal medicine by the American Board of Internal Medicine.

He has been certified to practice in the states of:

- Arizona
- Florida
- Hawaii
- Oregon
- Texas

Binmoeller was affiliated with the California Pacific Medical Center (CPMC) in San Francisco, CA, working as the Medical Director of the Interventional Endoscopy Services (IES). His work in the field of endoscopic procedures is amongst the presentations of the New Frontiers Course, held annually.

Binmoeller has been performing procedures in the field of interventional endoscopy since the 1980s. Throughout his career as a medical specialist, he has also held university appointments in both Europe and the United States. These include:

- Nice, France at the CHR Cimiez: 1990 to 1991
- Hamburg, Germany at the University Hospital Eppendorf in Hamburg: 1991 to 1998
- San Diego, USA at the UCSD Medical Center: 1998 to 2001

In 2001, Binmoeller founded the Interventional Endoscopy Services (IES) at the CPMC, Van Ness Campus and Mission Bernal Campus. This center was founded by Binmoeller, with him as acting Medical Director. The center's focus was on innovating and enabling new procedures in interventional endoscopy while improving existing techniques and technologies.

He has collaborated with multiple device manufacturers in an effort to improve existing products. He is also the clinical founder of several medical device start-ups:

1. Advent - Offered a treatment for GERD (Gastroesophageal Reflux Disease).
2. Endeau - Founded in September 2012, techniques and devices were developed for underwater endoscopic procedures, or Water-Aided Endoscopy (WAE), aimed at systemizing the way WAE was used in gastroenterology procedures. Binmoeller was the Clinical Director.
3. Endosphere - Was responsible for multiple patents that enable the psychological treatment of metabolic diseases and obesity. Binmoeller is the inventor of the Satisphere™ duodenal implant under this startup, a device that has undergone clinical trials.
4. KB Solutions Inc. - Where the novel endoscopic tissue closure device was developed.
5. Xlumena - Founded in 2004 by Binmoeller (Chief Medical Officer/Board Member) with a portfolio of EUS guided translumenal therapy inventions.

Binmoeller is owner of over 100 Endoscopic Technology patents. His first patent was filed in 1998 for an endosonographic guided tissue sampling device. Development and global commercialization was assigned to the Olympus Medical Corporation, which brought the NA-11J-KB Powershot needle to market. He is the inventor of the Lumen-Apposing Metal Stent (LAMS). His work on this was published in the Lumen-Apposing Stents, An Issue of Gastrointestinal Endoscopy Clinics, book.

=== International Scholars Program (ISP) ===
ISP has mentored and trained multiple endoscopists from all across the globe and launched a postgraduate program, The International Scholars Program in Advanced Endoscopy, in 2002 in collaboration with Sutter Health and California Pacific Medical Center. Binmoeller supervised a group of endoscopists and nurses, such as Dr. Janek Shah, Dr. Yasser Bhat, and Dr. Chris Hamerski. Its one-year training program reviews a broad spectrum of interventional endoscopic procedures, as well as various techniques like underwater resection of colonic polyps, endoscopic closure of gastrointestinal defects, and endoscopic therapy of subepithelial lesions, among other procedures. Financial support for scholars is provided by Endovision for ISP.

=== Non-Profit ===
The Endovision Foundation was Founded by Binmoeller in 2015 in San Francisco, California, and he is the current President and Chief Executive Officer, overseeing management and direction.

=== The AXIOS System ===
Binmoeller invented the AXIOS system for advanced interventional endoscopy. This has two components, the AXIOS Stent and a cautery-enabled access catheter, to provide an Electrocautery Enhanced Delivery System. The system allows an endoscopist to access walled-off necrosis and symptomatic pancreatic pseudocysts by means of a transduodenal or a trans gastric approach to then place the AXIOS stent.

This was the first system of its kind in the United States and is currently the only minimally invasive approach that entirely streamlines the process.

=== Xlumena acquired by Boston Scientific ===
In April 2015, Xlumena was acquired by Boston Scientific when they agreed to pay $62.5 million with an additional $12.5 million for sales-based milestones upon FDA clearance of HOT AXIOS, to go alongside the AXIOS Delivery System, which had already received FDA 510(k) clearance as the world’s first stent designed specifically for Endoscopic Ultrasound (EUS) guided transluminal drainage of symptomatic pancreatic pseudocysts.

=== Awards and Recognition ===
Binmoeller has received numerous honors recognizing his contributions to the field of interventional endoscopy.

In 2013, he was named Master Endoscopist of the Year by the American College of Gastroenterology (ACG). In 2019, he received the Da Vinci Award for Endoscopy.

In 2026, Binmoeller was honored with the Rudolf Schindler Award at the American Society of Gastrointestinal Endoscopy (ASGE) Crystal Awards Ceremony in Chicago, Illinois. The Rudolf Schindler Award is the highest honor bestowed by the ASGE, recognizing endoscopists who have made enduring contributions to the field. Binmoeller was recognized for his decades of Patient-centered innovation, including the invention of the lumen-apposing metal stent (LAMS) and the AXIOS system, the development of underwater endoscopic mucosal resection (EMR), and his work establishing new therapeutic paradigms in gastroenterology. He holds more than 50 patents for endoscopic technologies developed directly from clinical practice.

Upon receiving the award, Binmoeller has stated that the recognition reflects the privilege of preserving and restoring organs and sparing patients from more invasive interventions, describing innovation as something that emerges directly from the limitations encountered in daily practice.

== Selected honors, awards, and society memberships ==
=== Honors ===
- FACG - Fellow of the American College of Gastroenterology
- FASGE - Fellow of the American Society for Gastrointestinal Endoscopy
- FJGES - Fellow of the Japanese Gastrointestinal Endoscopy Society

=== Awards ===
- ACG Master Endoscopist of the Year Award (2013)
- Da Vinci Award for Endoscopy (2019)
- Gene And Lyn Overholt Endowed Lecture Award (2020)
- Rudolf Schindler Award (2026)

=== Memberships ===
- American Society Gastrointestinal Endoscopy
- American Gastroenterology Association

== Books, publications and articles ==
=== Books ===
- Therapeutic endoscopy : color atlas of operative techniques for the gastrointestinal tract. Nib Soehendra. Stuttgart: Thieme. 1998. ISBN 3-13-108261-5. OCLC 37247359.
- Lumen-Apposing Stents, An Issue of Gastrointestinal Endoscopy Clinics

=== Selected publications and articles ===
- Giovannini M, Binmoeller K, Seifert H (March 2003). "Endoscopic ultrasound-guided cystogastrostomy". Endoscopy. 35 (3): 239–45. doi:10.1055/s-2003-37268. PMID 12584645. S2CID 33952766.
- Yamamoto H, Ell C, Binmoeller KF (September 2008). "Double-balloon endoscopy". Endoscopy. 40 (9): 779–83. doi:10.1055/s-2008-1077518. PMID 18773343. S2CID 260128352.
- Nguyen NQ, Binmoeller KF, Shah JN (December 2009). "Cholangioscopy and pancreatoscopy (with videos)". Gastrointest Endosc. 70 (6): 1200–10. doi:10.1016/j.gie.2009.07.010. PMID 19863954.
- Cameron R, Binmoeller KF (June 2013). "Cyanoacrylate applications in the GI tract". Gastrointest Endosc. 77 (6): 846–57. doi:10.1016/j.gie.2013.01.028. PMID 23540441.
- Shah JN, Weilert F, Bhat YM, Binmoeller KF (August 2014). "Response". Gastrointest Endosc. 80 (2): 365–6. doi:10.1016/j.gie.2014.03.047. PMID 25034850.
- Weilert F, Bhat YM, Binmoeller KF, Shah JN (January 2015). "Response". Gastrointest Endosc. 81 (1): 242–3. doi:10.1016/j.gie.2014.08.027. PMID 25527062.
- Bhat YM, Weilert F, Fredrick RT, Kane SD, Shah JN, Hamerski CM, Binmoeller KF (June 2016). "EUS-guided treatment of gastric fundal varices with combined injection of coils and cyanoacrylate glue: a large U.S. experience over 6 years (with video)". Gastrointest Endosc. 83 (6): 1164–72. doi:10.1016/j.gie.2015.09.040. PMID 26452992.
- Johns E, Binmoeller KF (December 2016). "Subepithelial lesions: a deeper look". Gastrointest Endosc. 84 (6): 930–932. doi:10.1016/j.gie.2016.06.044. PMID 27855798.
- Binmoeller KF (January 2017). "Nonradiation, Endoscopic Ultrasound-Based Endoscopic Retrograde Cholangiopancreatography". Gastroenterol Hepatol (N Y). 13 (1): 58–61. PMC 5390327. PMID 28420948.
- Levy I, Binmoeller KF (2018). "EUS-guided vascular interventions". Endosc Ultrasound. 7 (4): 228–235. doi:10.4103/eus.eus_32_18. PMC 6106145. PMID 30117484.
- Binmoeller KF (June 2019). "Underwater EMR without submucosal injection: Is less more?". Gastrointest Endosc. 89 (6): 1117–1119. doi:10.1016/j.gie.2019.02.011. PMID 31104744.
- Nett A, Binmoeller K (October 2019). "Underwater Endoscopic Mucosal Resection". Gastrointest Endosc Clin N Am. 29 (4): 659–673. doi:10.1016/j.giec.2019.05.004. PMID 31445689. S2CID 199621242.
