= Boston Bowel Preparation Scale =

Scoring system for grading bowel-preparation quality during colonoscopy

- Other names: BBPS
- Specialty: Gastroenterology
- Uses: Grading bowel cleanliness quality during colonoscopy

The Boston Bowel Preparation Scale (BBPS) is a validated quality metric used in gastroenterology to grade the adequacy of bowel preparation (colon cleanliness) during colonoscopy. It rates how clearly the colonic mucosa can be seen after the endoscopist has completed all cleansing maneuvers, and is the most widely used bowel-preparation scale in colonoscopy research and practice. The score ranges from 0 to 9, and a total of 6 or greater is commonly used to define an adequate preparation.

Bowel-preparation quality is an established quality indicator for colonoscopy, because inadequate cleansing is associated with missed polyps and adenomas and with the need for earlier repeat examinations. The BBPS was designed to make this assessment objective and reproducible for colonoscopy outcomes research.

== Background ==
The diagnostic yield of colonoscopy depends on adequate bowel preparation, since residual stool and opaque fluid can obscure the mucosa and hide lesions. Before the BBPS, most bowel-preparation rating scales had been designed to compare oral purgatives and did not account for cleansing performed by the endoscopist during the procedure, limiting their usefulness in studies of colonoscopy outcomes such as polyp detection. The BBPS was introduced in 2009 to address this gap by rating cleanliness during the inspection phase of the examination, after washing and suctioning.

== Scoring ==
The BBPS was developed by Edwin Lai, Audrey Calderwood, Brian Jacobson and colleagues at Boston University Medical Center and published in Gastrointestinal Endoscopy in 2009. It assigns a segment score from 0 to 3 to each of the three broad regions of the colon—the right colon (including the cecum and ascending colon), the transverse colon (including the hepatic and splenic flexures), and the left colon (including the descending colon, sigmoid colon, and rectum):

- 0 – unprepared segment, with mucosa not seen due to solid stool that cannot be cleared;
- 1 – portion of the mucosa seen, but other areas not well seen due to staining, residual stool, and/or opaque liquid;
- 2 – minor residual staining, small fragments of stool, and/or opaque liquid, but mucosa seen well;
- 3 – entire mucosa of the segment seen well, with no residual staining, fragments, or opaque liquid.

The three segment scores are summed to give a total BBPS score ranging from 0 (unprepared colon) to 9 (perfectly clean colon). The score is assigned after all cleansing maneuvers are complete; if a procedure is aborted for inadequate preparation, non-visualized proximal segments are scored 0.

== Definition of adequate preparation ==
A total BBPS score of 6 or greater, with each segment scoring at least 2, is widely used as the standard definition of an adequate preparation, and is associated with recommendation of standard-interval (typically 10-year) follow-up after a normal screening colonoscopy. Total scores of 2 or below indicate an inadequate preparation for which the examination should generally be repeated within one year.

== Reliability and clinical significance ==
In the original study, the BBPS showed good inter-observer reliability (intraclass correlation coefficient 0.74) and intra-observer reliability (weighted kappa 0.77), and higher scores were associated with higher polyp detection rates and shorter procedure times. Subsequent studies have shown that inadequate BBPS scores predict a higher rate of polyps and advanced polyps at the next colonoscopy, supporting the scale's use in guiding surveillance intervals.

== Related scales ==
The BBPS is one of several validated bowel-preparation scales for colonoscopy, alongside the Ottawa Bowel Preparation Scale. An analogous instrument for grading mucosal visualization in the upper gastrointestinal tract during esophagogastroduodenoscopy is the Toronto Upper Gastrointestinal Cleaning Score.

== See also ==
- Colonoscopy
- Bowel preparation
- Ottawa Bowel Preparation Scale
- Toronto Upper Gastrointestinal Cleaning Score
