= D. Nageshwar Reddy =

Indian gastroenterologist

Dr. D. Nageshwar Reddy
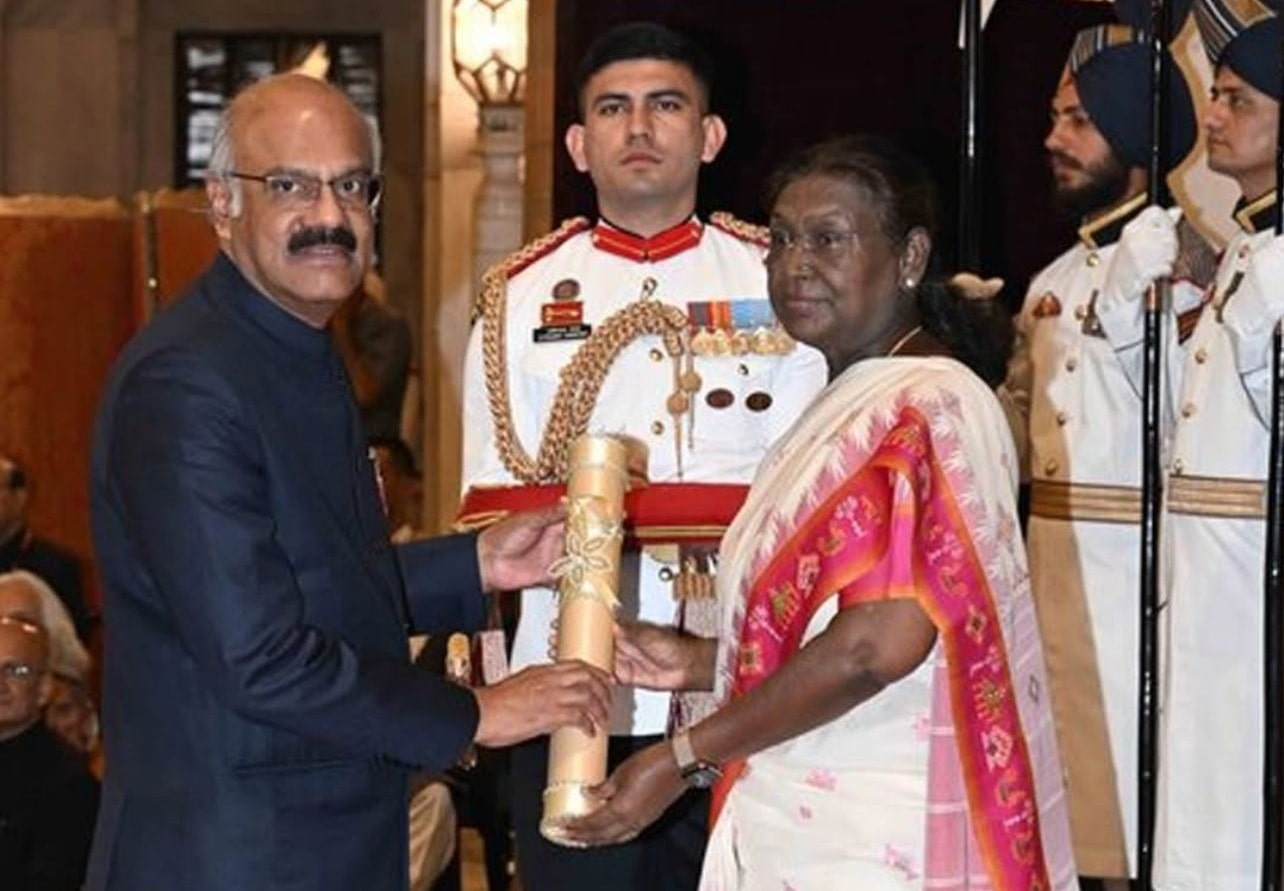
- *Master Endoscopist Award (2009)
- Born: 18 March 1956 (age 70); Visakhapatnam (Andhra State)
- Education: Kurnool Medical College; Madras Medical College; Postgraduate Institute of Medical Education and Research
- Occupation: Doctor
- Years active: 1978-Present
- Known for: Gastroenterology
- Relatives: Carol Ann Reddy (Wife)
- Medical career
- Profession: Medicine
- Field: Gastroenterology
- Institutions: Nizam's Institute of Medical Sciences, Hyderabad (Telangana); Guntur Medical College, Guntur (Andhra Pradesh); Asian Institute of Gastroenterology, Hyderabad (Telangana)
- Awards: B. C. Roy Award (1995); Padma Shri (2002); Master Endoscopist Award (2009); Masters of the World Gastroenterology Organisation (WGO) Award (2013); Padma Bhushan (2016); Rudolf V. Schindler Award (2021); Padma Vibhushan (2025)

Duvvur Nageshwar Reddy (born 18 March 1956) is an Indian gastroenterologist and endoscopist. He is the founder and chairman of the Asian Institute of Gastroenterology, the world’s largest gastroenterology hospital in Hyderabad. He is the first Indian doctor to receive all the three Padma Awards. He is a fellow of the National Academy of Medical Sciences and has served as the Chairman of the World Endoscopy Organization Research Committee.

Reddy's clinical and research work has focused on therapeutic gastrointestinal endoscopy, particularly pancreato-biliary endoscopy and endoscopic interventions for pancreatic and biliary disorders. He has also been involved in the training of gastroenterologists and endoscopists through professional and clinical education programmes.

Reddy received the Dr. B. C. Roy Award in 1995, the Padma Shri in 2002, the Padma Bhushan in 2016, and the Padma Vibhushan in 2025. He has also received international recognition from endoscopy and gastroenterology organisations, including the American Society for Gastrointestinal Endoscopy.

== Early life and education ==
Reddy was born on March 18, 1956 in Visakhapatnam, Andhra Pradesh. He comes from a family of doctors; he is a third-generation physician, with both his father and grandfather were doctors. He completed his early schooling in the city before enrolling at Kurnool Medical College, where he received his M.B.B.S.degree. He later pursued postgraduate training at Madras Medical College, earning his M.D. in General Medicine. Following this, he joined the Postgraduate Institute of Medical Education and Research (PGIMER), Chandigarh, where he completed his D.M. in Chandigarh.

== Career ==
=== Early career and academic roles ===
Reddy began his medical career in the early 1980s, working in gastrointestinal endoscopy, clinical research, and medical education. After earning a Doctorate of Medicine in gastroenterology from the Postgraduate Institute of Medical Education and Research, Chandigarh, he specialized in gastrointestinal endoscopy, which was then an emerging field in India. He began working as an assistant professor of gastroenterology at Nizam's Institute of Medical Sciences, Hyderabad, and later served as a professor at Guntur Medical College.

Asian institute of gastroenterology

=== Asian Institute of Gastroenterology ===
In 1994, Reddy founded the Asian Institute of Gastroenterology in Hyderabad, focusing on therapeutic endoscopy and early adoption of day-care units for endoscopic procedures. The institute serves patients from India and neighboring countries, including Sri Lanka, Bangladesh, and Malaysia.

Asian Institute of Gastroenterology Hospitals has organized free medical camps and outreach programs for underserved populations. During the COVID-19 pandemic, the hospital participated in efforts to develop treatment protocols for gastrointestinal symptoms in infected patients.

Reddy has also been involved in initiatives to expand diagnostic access, including mobile endoscopy units and screening programs in rural areas.

=== Research and training ===
Reddy's research has centered on therapeutic pancreato-biliary endoscopy and innovations in transgastric endoscopic surgery. He has participated in international endoscopy workshops and contributed to training programs for endoscopists worldwide.

Reddy has received multiple honors, including the Dr. B. C. Roy Award in 1995 for contributions to medical science, the Padma Shri in 2002, and the Padma Bhushan in 2016 for his work in gastroenterology. In 2009, he was awarded the Master Endoscopist Award by the American Society for Gastrointestinal Endoscopy (ASGE).

In 2021, he received the Rudolf V. Schindler Award from ASGE, followed by a Lifetime Achievement Award from the World Endoscopy Organisation. In 2025, he was honored with the Padma Vibhushan, India's second-highest civilian award, for his contributions to medicine. Later that year, he became the first Indian gastroenterologist to receive the Legends of Endoscopy Award from Japanese gastroenterologists at the Tokyo Live Global Endoscopy 2025 event.

Reddy has authored over 1,000 peer-reviewed publications and has spoken at international medical conferences.

== Selected publications ==
- Ramchandani, Mohan; Lakhtakia, Sundeep; Costamagna, Guido; Tringali, Andrea; Püspöek, Andreas; Tribl, Barbara; Dolak, Werner; Devière, Jacques; Arvanitakis, Marianna; Merwe, Schalk van der; Laleman, Wim; Ponchon, Thierry; Lepilliez, Vincent; Gabbrielli, Armando; Bernardoni, Laura (1 July 2021). "Fully Covered Self-Expanding Metal Stent vs Multiple Plastic Stents to Treat Benign Biliary Strictures Secondary to Chronic Pancreatitis: A Multicenter Randomized Trial". Gastroenterology. 161 (1): 185–195. doi:10.1053/j.gastro.2021.03.015. hdl:2013/ULB-DIPOT:oai:dipot.ulb.ac.be:2013/328620. ISSN 0016-5085. PMID 33741314.
- Chandak, G. R.; Idris, M. M.; Reddy, D. N.; Bhaskar, S.; Sriram, P. V. J.; Singh, L. (2002). "Mutations in the pancreatic secretory trypsin inhibitor gene (PSTI/SPINK1) rather than the cationic trypsinogen gene (PRSS1) are significantly associated with tropical calcific pancreatitis". Journal of Medical Genetics. 39 (5): 347–351. doi:10.1136/jmg.39.5.347. ISSN 1468-6244. PMC 1735106. PMID 12011155.
- Itoi, Takao; Itokawa, Fumihide; Umeda, Junko; Kuwatani, Masaki; Nagai, Takaaki; Kogure, Hiroshi; Ishii, Koichiro; Tanno, Shinichi; Moriyasu, Fumihiko; Kasugai, Kunio (2012). "New fully covered self-expandable metal stent for EUS-guided intervention in infectious walled-off pancreatic necrosis (with video)". Pain. 75 (3): 457–466. doi:10.1016/j.gie.2011.09.020. PMC 3558685. PMID 22154332.
- Tandan, Manu; Nageshwar Reddy, D.; Talukdar, Rupjyoti; Vinod, K.; Kiran, S. V. V. S.; Santosh, D.; Gupta, Rajesh; Ramchandani, Mohan; Lakhtakia, Sundeep; Rakesh, K.; Manohar Reddy, P.; Basha, Jahangeer; Nabi, Zaheer; Jagtap, Nitin; Rao, G. V. (2019). "ESWL for large pancreatic calculi: Report of over 5000 patients". Pancreatology. 19 (7): 916–921. doi:10.1016/j.pan.2019.08.001. ISSN 1424-3911. PMID 31447280.
- Kalapala, R.; Karyampudi, A.; Nabi, Z. (2022). "Endoscopic full‑thickness plication for the treatment of PPI‑dependent GERD: results from a randomised, sham‑controlled trial" (PDF). Gut. 71 (4): 686–694. doi:10.1136/gutjnl-2020-321811. PMC 8921577. PMID 33849942.

== Books ==
- Recent Advances in Pancreas - ECAB - E-Book. Elsevier India. 12 December 2014. ASIN B00WU284Z4.
- Innovations in Gastrointestinal Endoscopy. Springer Verlag, Singapore. 28 April 2021. ISBN 978-9811592461.
- Updates in Pancreatic Endotherapy, An Issue of Gastrointestinal Endoscopy Clinics, E-Book. Churchill Livingstone. 15 September 2023. ISBN 978-0443183621.
- ERCP E-Book. Elsevier - Health Sciences Division. 23 July 2024. ISBN 978-0323933629.

== Awards ==
- 1995: Dr. B. C. Roy Award from the Indian Medical Council
- 2002: Padma Shri from the Government of India
- 2009: Master Endoscopist Award from The American Society of Gastrointestinal Endoscopy (ASGE).
- 2013: World’s highest gastroenterology award in Shanghai, China.
- 2016: Padma Bhushan by the Government of India
- 2017: Dr. M G Garg All Time Achievement Award by the Indian Medical Association (IMA)
- 2017: Dhanvantari Award for Gastroenterology by the Dhanvantari Medical Foundation for his work in gastroenterology and medical science
- 2021: Lifetime Achievement Award from the World Endoscopy Organisation
- 2021: Rudolf V. Schindler Award, by the American Society for Gastrointestinal Endoscopy (ASGE)
- 2021: Eashwari Bai Memorial Award
- 2022: Distinguished Educator Award by the American Gastroenterological Association (AGA)
- 2022: Doctor of Science (DSc) by the Institute of Liver and Biliary Sciences, New Delhi
- 2023: Charaka Award from Rotary Club of Guindy
- 2023: Lifetime Achievement Award by the Federation of Telangana Chambers of Commerce and Industry (FTCCI), Hyderabad
- 2024: Johns Hopkins University’s ‘Captain’s Chair’
- 2025: Padma Vibhushan, the second-highest civilian award, by the Government of India
- 2025: Legends of Endoscopy award from Japanese gastroenterologists
- 2025: Ambuj Nath Bose Prize in recognition of his contributions to the field of endoscopy.
- 2026: Elected to the College of Fellows of the American Institute for Medical and Biological Engineering (AIMBE).
