= Toronto Upper Gastrointestinal Cleaning Score =

Quality metric for mucosal visualization during upper gastrointestinal endoscopy

- Other names: TUGCS
- Specialty: Gastroenterology
- Uses: Grading mucosal visualization quality during esophagogastroduodenoscopy

The Toronto Upper Gastrointestinal Cleaning Score (TUGCS) is a standardized quality metric used in gastroenterology to grade the adequacy of mucosal visualization during esophagogastroduodenoscopy (EGD, or gastroscopy), the endoscopic examination of the esophagus, stomach, and duodenum. It assigns a numerical score to how clearly the lining of the upper gastrointestinal tract can be seen after cleansing, and functions as an upper gastrointestinal counterpart to the bowel preparation scales, such as the Boston Bowel Preparation Scale, that grade visualization quality in colonoscopy.

Adequate mucosal visualization is regarded as a quality indicator for upper gastrointestinal endoscopy, because inadequate cleanliness is associated with missed lesions. The TUGCS was created to make this assessment objective and reproducible, in the same way that bowel-preparation scales standardized the reporting of visualization quality in colonoscopy.

== Background ==
The diagnostic accuracy of esophagogastroduodenoscopy depends on clear mucosal visualization, and residual food, fluid, bubbles, foam, and mucus can obscure the mucosa and hide lesions. Studies have estimated that a meaningful proportion of upper gastrointestinal cancers are missed at endoscopy, motivating interest in cleanliness and visualization as measurable quality indicators. In colonoscopy, validated bowel preparation scales such as the Boston Bowel Preparation Scale are used routinely to grade cleanliness, and better preparation is associated with higher adenoma detection. Before the TUGCS, few validated instruments existed to grade mucosal cleanliness in the upper gastrointestinal tract in an equivalent way.

== Development ==
The TUGCS was developed by researchers at Scarborough Health Network Research Institute at the University of Toronto and published in the journal Endoscopy. It was constructed using Delphi methodology: an international panel of 14 endoscopy experts iteratively rated proposed score items and anchors on a five-point Likert scale over three rounds, with an 80% agreement threshold for consensus.

== Scoring ==
The TUGCS grades mucosal visualization in four anatomical regions—the gastric fundus, body, and antrum, and the duodenum—each on a scale from 0 to 3:

- 0 – solid food, blood, or content obscuring most of the region;
- 1 – mucus, bubbles, or liquid requiring suction and/or washing;
- 2 – non-adherent material requiring suction but not washing;
- 3 – mucosa clearly visible without suction or washing.

The four regional scores are summed to give a total ranging from 0 (poor visibility) to 12 (excellent visibility). Unlike colonoscopy, where a Boston Bowel Preparation Scale total of 6 or more is a commonly used adequacy threshold, no cutoff for defining adequate visualization or indicating a need for repeat endoscopy has yet been formally validated for the TUGCS, although a total of 6 or greater has been used in exploratory analyses.

== Validation ==
In the original prospective validation, the score showed inter-rater reliability (intraclass correlation coefficient) of 0.79 (95% CI 0.64–0.88), test–retest reliability of 0.83 (95% CI 0.77–0.87), and internal consistency (Cronbach's alpha) of 0.81, and correlated positively with an independent endoscopist's global rating of mucosal visualization.

A 2025 multicentre, single-masked study across ten European pediatric gastroenterology centres validated the TUGCS in children, an age group for which no validated mucosal-visualization instrument previously existed; among 17 endoscopists of varying experience it showed test–retest reliability of 0.97 and high internal consistency. A 2026 prospective single-centre study of 175 patients undergoing diagnostic EGD reported excellent interobserver reliability (ICC 0.95). Higher TUGCS values, both as a continuous measure and at a threshold of 6 or greater, were independently associated with increased detection of gastroduodenal findings after adjustment for age, sex, simethicone use, and procedure duration, mirroring the relationship between bowel preparation quality and lesion detection in colonoscopy.

== Use as a quality metric ==
Mucosal visualization is recognized as a quality indicator for upper gastrointestinal endoscopy by professional societies including the American Society for Gastrointestinal Endoscopy (ASGE). The 2025 update of the European Society of Gastrointestinal Endoscopy (ESGE) performance measures for upper gastrointestinal endoscopy recommends that reporting of a diagnostic examination include a mucosal visibility score based on a standardized, validated scale, and cites the TUGCS among such instruments. The score has also been cited in clinical practice guidelines on upper gastrointestinal conditions, including the MAPS III guideline on gastric precancerous conditions, the American College of Gastroenterology guideline on gastric premalignant conditions, and the ASGE guideline on gastroesophageal reflux disease.

== Comparison with colonoscopy ==
The TUGCS is frequently described as the upper gastrointestinal analogue of the Boston Bowel Preparation Scale and other bowel preparation scales used in colonoscopy: in both settings, a validated cleanliness score standardizes how clearly the mucosa can be seen, supports comparison across endoscopists and centres, and links visualization quality to lesion detection.

== See also ==
- Esophagogastroduodenoscopy
- Boston Bowel Preparation Scale
