= Helen Cooke =

American scientist (1943–2021)

- Born: Helen Joan Cooke; May 22, 1943; Sunderland, Massachusetts
- Died: December 27, 2021 (aged 78)
- Education: University of Massachusetts, Amherst; University of California, Los Angeles; University of Sydney
- Scientific career
- Workplaces: University of Iowa; University of Kansas; University of Nevada, Reno; Ohio State University
- Thesis: Development of renal function in the late-embryonic and hatched chicken (1971)

Helen Joan Cooke (May 22, 1943 – December 27, 2021) was an American gastroenterologist who was a professor at Ohio State University. She studied intestinal mucosa and pioneered the field of neurobiology. Throughout her career, Cooke campaigned to support women and early career researchers.

== Early life and education ==
Cooke was born outside Sunderland, Massachusetts, and grew up in a farming town. She was determined to explore the world, and decided to do so through academia. Cooke earned a B.S. in zoology (1965) at the University of Massachusetts Amherst and an M.S. in physiology (1967) at University of California, Los Angeles. Cooke completed her doctoral research on renal function at the University of Sydney. She studied the transport of electrolytes and amino acids, and was awarded a Ph.D. in physiology in 1971.

== Research and career ==
Cooke returned to the United States, where she worked at the University of Iowa and University of Kansas Medical Center. She was eventually recruited to the faculty at the University of Nevada, Reno. She spent most of her career at Ohio State University, where she worked between faculties to better understand the enteric nervous system. The enteric nervous system describes the intrinsic nerves within the gut, and consists of two neural plexuses that contain myenteric and submucosal ganglia. In the 1980s, Cooke demonstrated that the enteric nervous system can regulate sodium and chloride. She showed electrical field simulation can activate neurons on the submucosal plexus, and developed a comprehensive description of fluid transport.

Cooke was involved with the American Gastroenterological Association. She was a founding member of the Steering Committee on Women, and campaigned to improve the experiences of early career researchers. She was a member of the American Physiological Society, and established the Women in Physiology Committee.

=== Selected publications ===
- Cooke, Helen (1986). "Neurobiology of the intestinal mucosa". Gastroenterology. 90 (4): 1057–1081. doi:10.1016/0016-5085(86)90889-9. PMID 2419199. Wikidata Q38160082.
- Cooke, Helen (1994). "Neuroimmune signaling in regulation of intestinal ion transport". American Journal of Physiology. 266 (2 Pt 1): G167-78. doi:10.1152/ajpgi.1994.266.2.g167. PMID 8141289. Wikidata Q40732170.
- Cooke, Helen (2000). "Neurotransmitters in neuronal reflexes regulating intestinal secretion". Annals of the New York Academy of Sciences. 915: 77–80. doi:10.1111/j.1749-6632.2000.tb05225.x. PMID 11193603. Wikidata Q34148635.

== Personal life ==
Cooke had two sons and four grandchildren. She suffered from Parkinson's disease and died in December 2021.
