= Hashem El-Serag =

Palestinian-American physician

Hashem B. El-Serag
- هاشم السراج
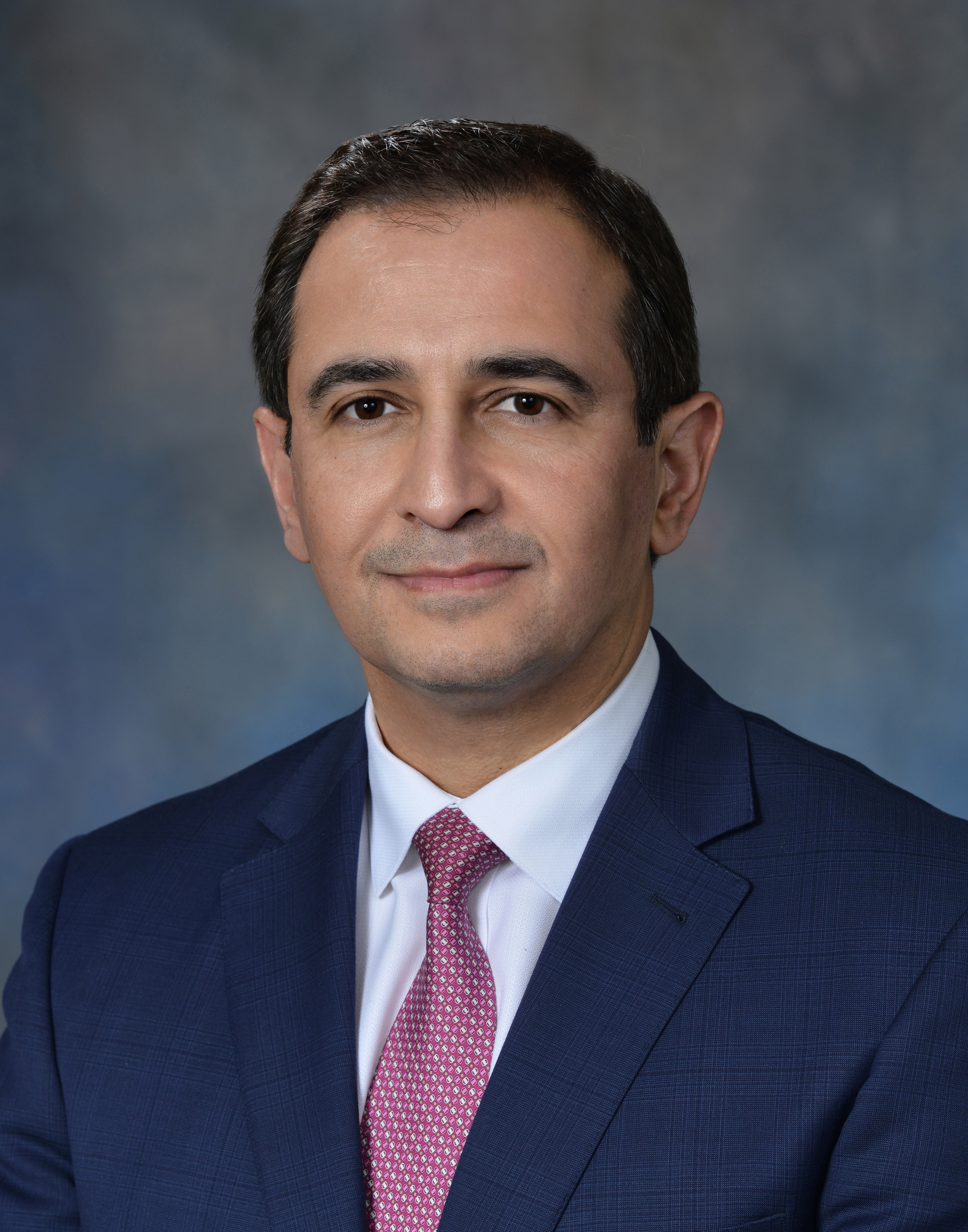
- Dr. Hashem B. El-Serag
- Born: July 30, 1966 (age 60); Kingdom of Libya
- Education: Al-Arab Medical University, (Libya) Yale University Greenwich Hospital (Connecticut), University of New Mexico
- Occupations: Gastroenterologist, Medical researcher; Department Chairman
- Employer: Baylor College of Medicine
- Known for: Hepatocellular carcinoma research, Epidemiology

Hashem B. El-Serag (Arabic: هاشم السراج) is a Palestinian-American physician and medical researcher best known for his research in liver cancer, hepatocellular carcinoma (HCC) and the hepatitis C virus. He serves as the Margaret M. and Albert B. Alkek Chairman of the Department of Medicine at Baylor College of Medicine as well as the co-director of the Texas Medical Center Digestive Disease Center. El-Serag previously served as president of the American Gastroenterological Association and Editor-in-Chief of Clinical Gastroenterology and Hepatology.

== Early life and education ==
El-Serag was born in 1966 in Libya to Palestinian parents from the Gaza Strip. He received his M.D. with Honors from Al-Arab Medical University in Benghazi, Libya in 1991. He then moved to the United States, where he performed his residency in internal medicine at Yale University Greenwich Hospital (Connecticut) (1993-1995) and received a gastroenterology fellowship in clinical gastroenterology at the University of New Mexico in Albuquerque (1995-1997), before earning his Master of Public Health from the University of New Mexico in 1998.

== Research and career ==
Most of the research on hepatocellular carcinoma in the United States can be attributed to El-Serag, who has published more than 300 scholarly papers on the subject. Dr. El-Serag also has become a leading expert on chronic liver disease and gastroesophageal reflux disease. His research also focuses on the clinical epidemiology and outcomes of several digestive disorders, including Barrett's esophagus, esophageal adenocarcinoma and hepatitis C. He has obtained more than 60 funded research grants, including those from the National Institutes of Health, the Cancer Prevention and Research Institute of Texas, the VA and professional societies.

Dr. El-Serag joined the Michael E. DeBakey VA Medical Center and Baylor College of Medicine in Houston, Texas in 1999, where he later became Chief of the Baylor College of Medicine Section of Gastroenterology and Hepatology (2007-2016) in the Department of Medicine. He also served as Leader, Cancer Prevention and Population Sciences Program, at the Dan L Duncan Comprehensive Cancer Center, and as Chief of Clinical Epidemiology and Outcomes Division at Michael E. DeBakey VA Medical Center. In 2014, he became the Director of the Texas Medical Center Digestive Disease Center, funded by a P-30 NIH Grant and one of only six successful centers in the United States. In 2017, he was selected to serve as the Margaret M. and Albert B. Alkek Chairman of the Department of Medicine at Baylor College of Medicine, where he also serves as a professor, researcher and clinician. He also is an adjunct professor in the Department of Epidemiology at the School of Public Health, University of Texas Health Science Center. El-Serag has given more than 300 local, regional, national and international presentations.

== Awards and memberships ==
Selected awards include:

- 2019 - “World's Most Influential Scientific Minds” in the area of Clinical Medicine by Thomson Reuters
- 2016 - Michael E. DeBakey Excellence in Research Award
- 2016 - NAAMA Local Chapter Prestigious Award
- 2016 - Ben Qurrah Award
- 2011 - Blue Faery Award for Excellence in Liver Cancer Research
- 2005 - American Gastroenterological Association's Masters Award in Clinical Research
- 2003 - American Gastroenterological Association's Young Clinical Investigator Award
- 1997 - GlaxoWellcome Digestive Health Foundation Award for Health Care Advancement

== Publications and media ==
El-Serag has more than 550 published papers to his credit, including in the New England Journal of Medicine, JAMA, Annals of Internal Medicine, Archives of Internal Medicine, Gastroenterology, Hepatology, and GUT. Published in the New England Journal of Medicine, Rising Incidence of Hepatocellular Carcinoma in the United States, has been cited approximately 3400 times. He has a H. index of 153. In addition, he was the Associate Editor of Gastroenterology and Editor-in-Chief of Clinical Gastroenterology and Hepatology (2012-2017).

Dr. El-Serag is co-author of the book Contemporary Diagnosis and Management of Upper GI Disorders.
