= Mark Pochapin =

American gastroenterologist

Mark Pochapin is a gastroenterologist and educator whose work is focused on the prevention, early detection, and treatment of gastrointestinal cancers.

== Early life ==
Mark Pochapin grew up in Spring Valley, New York, one of two children. He graduated from Spring Valley High School in 1980 and went on to graduate from the University of Pennsylvania with a degree in biomedical engineering in 1984.

== Career ==
After graduating from Weill Cornell Medical College in New York City in 1988, Dr. Pochapin went on to become Chief of Gastrointestinal Endoscopy at New York-Presbyterian Hospital/Weill Cornell Medical College, where he was twice presented with the prestigious Elliot Hochstein Teaching Award, considered the highest faculty award given by vote of the Weill Cornell graduating medical school class for 'the qualities of compassion, skill, and distinction as a physician and teacher.'

Dr. Pochapin is presently Director of the Division of Gastroenterology at the NYU Langone Medical Center, Professor of Gastroenterology at the NYU School of Medicine, and Vice Chair for Clinical Affairs in the Dept of Medicine. He is a past president of the American College of Gastroenterology.

Dr. Pochapin hosts Chief’s Rounds, a biweekly national radio broadcast on SiriusXM Doctor Radio, and is the author of What Your Doctor May Not Tell You About Colorectal Cancer.

== The Couric effect ==
In the late 1990s Dr. Pochapin began treating Jay Monahan, a 41 year old patient with advanced colon cancer. His wife was the journalist Katie Couric, and after Monahan's death from the disease, Couric partnered with Dr. Pochapin to open The Jay Monahan Center for Gastrointestinal Health which opened on March 30, 2004 with Pochapin as its first director.

To further raise awareness about colon cancer and its prevention, Katie Couric had her own colonoscopy live on The Today Show, a first for morning television. Researchers at the University of Michigan found that colonoscopy screening in the United States increased by nearly 20 percent following the broadcast. They called this the 'Couric effect'. In 2010 Dr. Pochapin performed a colonoscopy on Harry Smith, anchor of The Early Show, also live on the air, to the same aim.

The incidence of colon cancer—the second-leading cause of cancer death in the United States—has dropped by approximately 30 percent over the past decade in men and women age 50 or older.

== Personal life ==
He is married to Dr. Shari Midoneck, a specialist in internal medicine. They live in New York City and have two sons.
