= European Society of Neurogastroenterology and Motility =

The European Society of Neurogastroenterology & Motility (ESNM) is a professional medical non-profit organization that was founded in 1982. The ESNM has over 3,100 European members, who are involved in the study of neuroscience and the pathophysiology of gastrointestinal function, and more generally in the advancement of neurogastroenterology.

The ESNM is a member of the United European Gastroenterology, a larger organization of European medical societies concerned with gastroenterology and digestive diseases.

== Presentation ==
=== History ===
The European Society of Neurogastroenterology and Motility was founded in 1982 in Leuven, Belgium by Gaston Vantrappen, Martin Wienbeck, David Wingate and other scientists.

In 2004, the association had 350 members. Four years later, the membership had reached 1,000 participants coming from 11 different countries. In 2017, the ESNM has more than 3,100 from all over the world.

=== Mission ===
The ESNM's mission is to:

- improve and promote a better understanding of digestive diseases among the public and medical experts
- educate young physicians
- develop the exchange of scientific and medical knowledge among specialists in the field of neurogastroenterology
- improve standards of care across Europe
- encourage research

=== Structure ===
The organizational structure of the ESNM consists of :

- Steering committee
- General assembly
- Auditors

==== Steering committee ====
The 2016 steering committee officers are:

- President: Giovanni Barbara (Bologna, Italy)
- Treasurer: Paul Enck (Tübingen, Germany)

Steering committee members are :

- Fernando Azpiroz (Barcelona, Spain), former ESNM president (2002 to 2013) and currently chairman of the ESNM's Gut Microbiota & Health Section
- Jan Tack (Leuven, Belgium)
- André Smout (Amsterdam, Netherlands)
- Serhat Bor (İzmir, Turkey)
- Roberto De Giorgio (Bologna, Italy)
- Luis Novais (Carnaxide, Portugal)
- Sabine Roman (Lyon, France)
- Ram Dickman (Petah Tikva, Israel)
- Adam Farmer (London, United Kingdom)
- Beate Niesler (Heidelberg, Germany)
- Asbjorn Mohr Drewes (Aalborg, Denmark)
- Jordi Serra (Barcelona, Spain)
- Alexander Trukhmanov (Moscow, Russia)
- Vasile Drug (Iași, Romania)
- Daniel Pohl (Zurich, Switzerland)
- Niall Hyland (Cork, Ireland)

==== Members ====
The ESNM currently consists of more than 3,100 individual members and 16 affiliated societies and the Gut Microbiota & Health section.

==== Affiliated national societies and groups ====
These national and interest groups are:

- Belgian Network on Gastrointestinal Regulatory Mechanisms (GIREM)
- British Society of Gastroenterology, Neurogastroenterology Section
- Dutch Society of Gastroenterology, Motility Section
- French Club of Gastrointestinal Motility (GFNG)
- German Society of Neurogastroenterology and Motility (DGNM)
- Gut Microbiota & Health Section (GM&H)
- Israeli Neurogastroenterology Group
- Italian Group for the Study of Gastrointestinal Motility (GISMAD)
- Polish Neurogastroenterology and Motility Group
- Portuguese Nucleus of Neurogastroenterology and Digestive Motility
- Romanian Society of Neurogastroenterology
- Russian Group of Neurogastroenterology and Motility (RGNM)
- Scandinavian Association of Neurogastroenterology and Motility (SAGIM)
- Spanish Digestive Motility Group (GEMD)
- Turkish Neurogastroenterology and Motility Study Group
- Irish Society of Gastroenterology (Neurogastroenterology and Motility section)
- Swiss Neurogastro-Motility Network

== Activities ==
To achieve its goals, the ESNM:

- organise events such as scientific congresses and symposia
- publish the "Neurogastroenterology and Motility" journal
- promote the exchange of knowledge relating to neurogastroenterology
- support patients in the field of gastrointestinal pathophysiology

The ESNM also sponsors and supports educational programs in the field of neurogastroenterology.

=== Congresses and events ===
==== Joint International Neurogastroenterology and Motility Meeting ====
In 2005, the American Neurogastroenterology and Motility Society (ANMS) and the European Society for Neurogastroenterology and Motility decided to organize Joint International Neurogastroenterology and Motility meetings.

Date	Place	Event
14–19 September 2006	Boston, United States	1st Joint International Meeting of the ESNM, the American Neurogastroenterology Societies (ANMS), the Functional Brain Gut Research Group (FBG) and the International Group for Neurogastroenterology and Motility. Among the topics covered in the lectures were: methodologies for health care research, regulation of appetite and obesity and GI motility disorders in children. Workshops covered topics such as the role of serotonin, neuroimaging and placebo effects.
6–9 November 2008	Lucerne, Switzerland	2nd Joint International Neurogastroenterology and Motility Meeting.
26–30 August 2009	Chicago, United States	3rd Joint International Neurogastroenterology and Motility Meeting. This event aimed at improving understanding of intestinal microflora, new diagnostics, the enteric nervous system and motility disorders of the esophagus.
26–29 August 2010	Boston, United States	4th Joint International Neurogastroenterology and Motility Meeting. During these days, applicants discussed mechanisms, medical diagnosis, therapy, brain-gut interactions, psychological aspects of the neurogastroenterology and motility disorders.
6–8 September 2012	Bologna, Italy	5th Joint International Neurogastroenterology and Motility Meeting. The purpose was to bring together neurogastroenterology and digestive diseases experts and researchers. This event also offered various conferences and lectures designed to attract physicians and health care professionals interested in staying current on developments in the fields. Topics included the latest scientific breakthroughs, new technologies, stress and pain mechanisms and factors that influence gut flora and digestive disorders.

==== Federation of Neurogastroenterology and Motility Meeting ====
The Federation of Neurogastroenterology and Motility (FNM) Meeting Congress is the follower of the Joint International Neurogastroenterology and Motility Meeting. It is held every two years and is jointly organized by the full members of the International Joint Federation: ANMS (American Neurogastroenterology and Motility Society), the ESNM (European Society of Neurogastroenterology and Motility) and the ANMA (Asian Neurogastroenterology and Motility Association). Associate members and also present in the scientific committee are SLNG (La Sociedad Latinoamericana de Neurogastroenterologia) and ANGMA (Australasian Neurogastroenterology and Motility Association).

The 1st Federation of Neurogastroenterology and Motility Meeting was held in Guangzhou, China, in 2014. It was hosted by the Chinese Society of Gastrointestinal Motility.

The second FNM meeting took take place in San Francisco, California August 26–28, 2016.

ENSM will host the 3rd FNM meeting in Amsterdam, the Netherlands, August 29-September 1, 2018.

==== Neurogastroenterology meetings – NeuroGASTRO ====
ESNM starts a new series of Europe-based Neurogastroenterology meetings every two years alternating to the Joint international meetings. NeuroGASTRO meetings bring together experts and emerging young investigators involved in neurogastroenterology, digestive motility and functional gastrointestinal diseases from Europe and from all around the world. The first edition of NeuroGASTRO was held in Istanbul, Turkey, in 2015. The program prepared by the scientific committee included the following topics:

- molecular and environmental factors influencing neuromuscular and other components of the gut wall
- stress mechanisms of gastrointestinal functional and motility disorders
- pain mechanisms, nutrient / microbiome sensing and function
- epidemiological, pathophysiological and clinical aspects of functional esophago-gastro-intestinal disorders
- new technologies for the assessment of esophago-gastro-intestinal motility and perception
- shortcomings and promises of current and future therapies.

The NeuroGASTRO Meeting took place in Cork, Ireland, August 24–26, 2017.

=== Neurogastroenterology and Motility journal ===
Neurogastroenterology and Motility is a bimonthly peer-reviewed medical journal covering neurogastroenterology and gastrointestinal motility. It is the official journal of the ESNM and the American Neurogastroenterology and Motility Society (ANMS).

It edits clinical observations, abstracts of congresses and lectures, meeting reports and book and article reviews. The journal publishes papers from scientists worldwide working in the field of gastrointestinal motility, clinical research and treatments.

Neurogastroenterology and Motility is published by Wiley-Blackwell.

Scientists can submit their articles to the journal. It accepts or refuses the paper after an editorial and peer review process.

According to the publisher, this process is independent of the societies affiliated with the journal. Neither the ESNM, the ANMS, the FBG nor Wiley-Blackwell have any editorial decision-making power.

In 2016, the editors-in-chief are Drs. Gianrico Farrugia, Magnus Simren and Gary Mawe.

== The Gut Microbiota and Health Section ==
In 2011, the ESNM launched the Gut Microbiota & Health Section.

It was set up to raise awareness and understanding of the links between gut microbiota and human health, to expand knowledge and to increase interest in the subject of gut flora.

=== Board of directors ===
In 2012, the president of the Gut Microbiota & Health Section of the ESNM was Professor Fernando Azpiroz.

In 2016, the Gut Microbiota & Health Section's board is composed of: Fernando Azpiroz, chairman (Spain), Qasim Aziz (United Kingdom), Joël Doré (France), Paul Enck (Germany), Francesco Guarner (Spain), Magnus Simrén (Sweden), Giovanni Barbara (Italy), S. Murch (United Kingdom), H. Sokol (France), M. Trauner (Austria).

The Gut Microbiota & Health Section is open to any professional involved in the field of gut microbiota.

=== Activities ===
The section seeks to: provide a forum on new discoveries in gut microbiota and health, to stimulate and encourage research, to share news and information on topics related to gut microbiota, to provide science and educational activities to widely disseminate knowledge in this field.

==== Gut Microbiota For Health website ====
The Gut Microbiota & Health Section has launched a website on gut microbiota in 2012. Gut Microbiota for Health is an online platform dedicated to experts and to the public. One section, named "Gut Microbiota Research and Practice" is aimed at professionals (researchers, MDs, PhDs...), the other "Gut Microbiota News Watch" is dedicated to a wider audience.

===== Gut Microbiota Research and Practice =====
The Gut Microbiota Research and Practice section is aimed at researchers, scientists and health care professionals. It contains papers and reviews, abstracts of congresses and events, and discussions of recent findings on the human digestive system, the immune system, metabolic conditions and gut-brain axis... Thanks to an Internet forum, this section enables scientists from around the world to debate and discuss on gut microbiota issues. Researchers are also allowed to send and submit their scientific articles.

This section gathers 900 online members, which include scientists, clinicians, journalists, institutional representatives... It also brings together 1800 Twitter followers, 1800 LinkedIn members, and 2500 newsletter subscribers with a common interest in gut microbiota.

===== Gut Microbiota News Watch =====
The other section of the Gut Microbiota For Health website is dedicated to a wider audience. It is called "Gut Microbiota News Watch" and gathers the most recent information on gut microbiota. The aim is to spread information to the mass media and the public.

Gut Microbiota News Watch is dedicated to promoting and spreading information on gut microbiota to the mass media and the public. It offers easy-to understand information on gut microbiota, its key role in the human body, its importance for health and its role in the vital functions.

This website is also connected to social media such as Facebook and Twitter, in order to create a gut microbiota-aware community.

==== Gut Microbiota for Health World Summit ====
The ESNM's Gut Microbiota & Health Section organizes the annual Gut Microbiota for Health World Summit. The aim is to gather together leading international gut microbiota experts and to keep them up to date through lectures and workshops on the latest advances in gut microbiota research.

It is organized by the Gut Microbiota & Health Section and the American Gastroenterological Association (AGA) with the support of the Danone group.

The first summit was held in Evian-les-Bains, France, in 2012. More than 200 specialists from 30 different countries participated in this event.

The 2nd Gut Microbiota for Health World Summit was held in Madrid, Spain, a year later.

The 3rd Gut Microbiota for Health World Summit took place in Miami, United States, in 2014. Among the topics covered: In what way does gut microbiota influence functional bowel disorders? How is gut microbiota involved in the development of the metabolic syndrome? Can diet and probiotics have a positive effect on mental health?.

The 4th summit was held in Barcelona, Spain. Since 2015, the European Crohn's and Colitis Organization and the European Society for Pediatric Gastroenterology Hepatology and Nutrition joined the summit as co-partners.

The 5th Gut Microbiota for Health World Summit took place in Miami, Florida, in 2016. During this event, scientists discussed topics ranging from diet switch impact on gut microbiota, to pre and probiotics, including fecal microbiota transplantations...

==== Other activities ====
The Gut Microbiota & Health Section publishes scientific papers on gut flora. Its first paper was published in the Neurogastroenterology and Motility journal in 2013. Its theme was: "Gut microbiota and gastrointestinal health: current concepts and future directions".
