= Bruce E. Sands =

American gastroenterologist

Bruce E. Sands is an American gastroenterologist, focusing in colonoscopy, Crohn's disease, inflammatory bowl disease, ulcerative colitis and upper GI endoscopy, currently the Dr. Burrill B. Crohn Professor of Medicine at Mount Sinai School of Medicine and is an Elected Fellow of the American College of Gastroenterology and American Gastroenterological Association.

He earned degrees from Boston University (MD) and the Harvard School of Public Health (MS).
