= Thomas D. Schiano =

- Born: Brooklyn, New York
- Education: Fordham University; Universidad Del Noreste Medical School
- Scientific career
- Fields: transplantation
- Workplaces: Mount Sinai Medical Center

Thomas D. Schiano is an American specialist in liver transplantation, intestinal transplantation and in the diagnosis and treatment of acute and chronic liver disease. He serves as associate editor for the journals Hepatology and Liver Transplantation and has published more than 200 peer-reviewed articles and abstracts and more than 20 book chapters.

Schiano is currently professor of medicine at the Mount Sinai School of Medicine as well as the medical director of adult liver transplantation, medical director of intestinal transplantation and director of clinical hepatology at the Recanati/Miller Transplantation Institute at the Mount Sinai Medical Center in New York City. He is listed among New York Magazine's Best Doctors, as well as among the New York Times Magazine's list of Super Doctors 2008 -2011.

== Biography ==
Schiano was born in Brooklyn, New York. He graduated from Fordham University with a B.S. in biology and a minor in philosophy in 1979 and received his M.D. from Universidad Del Noreste Medical School in Tampico, Mexico in 1983. His residency and chief residency in internal medicine were completed at Maimonides Medical Center and he completed fellowships at Memorial Sloan-Kettering (in clinical nutrition), Temple University Hospital (in gastroenterology), and Mount Sinai Hospital (in liver disease and liver transplantation).

Schiano is a member of the American Association for the Study of Liver Diseases, the American College of Gastroenterology, the American Gastroenterological Association, the American Society for Gastrointestinal Endoscopy, the New York Organ Donor Network and the American Society of Transplantation.

Areas of research include liver transplantation, living donor liver transplantation, herbal and drug hepatotoxicity, nutrition and liver disease, cirrhosis, intestinal transplantation, recurrence of disease post-liver transplantation, treatment of viral hepatitis post-liver transplantation, herbal and alternative treatments of chronic liver disease, complications of cirrhosis, portal hypertension, and cholestasis associated with TPN.

Schiano is the currently a principal investigator on clinical trial A Rollover Protocol to Provide Open-Label Emtricitabine/Tenofovir Disoproxil Fumarate Combination Product to Subjects Completing the GS-US-203-0107 Study, Protocol GS-US-203-0109.

== Honors and awards ==
- 2009, 2011, Best Doctors in America
- 2009, 2010, New York Magazine Top Doctors
- 2008-2011, New York Super Doctors, the New York Times Magazine
- 2008, 2009, 2011, Castle Connolly America's Top Doctors
- 2006, TRIO (Transplant Recipients International Organization) Manhattan Chapter Triangle Award for Transplant Physicians
- 1995, Sol Sherry Award for Excellence in Basic Research, Temple University Hospital

== Book chapters ==
- Liu J-B, Schiano TD, Miller LS. Upper gastrointestinal tract. In Liu J-B, Goldberg BB (eds): Endoluminal Ultrasound. London, Martin Dunitz Ltd, 1998;147-200.
- Alexander AA, Miller LS, Schiano TD, Liu-J-B. Lower gastrointestinal tract. In Liu J-B, Goldberg BB (eds): Endoluminal Ultrasound. London, Martin Dunitz Ltd, 1998;201-28.
- Miller LS, Schiano TD, Liu J-B. Pancreaticobiliary tract: In Liu J-B, Goldberg BB (eds): Endoluminal Ultrasound. London, Martin Dunitz Ltd, 1998;229-50.
- Schiano TD, Ehrenpreis ED. Gut and hepatobiliary dysfunction: In Hall JB, Schmidt GA, Wood LDH (eds): Principles of Critical Care, 2nd edition, U.S.A., McGraw-Hill, 1998;1221-36.
- Schiano TD, Black M. Drug-induced and toxic liver disease. In Friedman LS, Keeffe EB (eds): Handbook of Liver Disease. London, Churchill Livingstone, 1998;103-24. ISBN 0-8493-9896-7
- Black M, Schiano TD. Management of overlap syndromes. In Krawitt EL (ed): Medical Management of Liver Diseases. New York, Marcel Dekker, Inc. 1999;165-80.
- Schiano TD. Tumors and cysts: In DiBiase JK (ed): Gastroenterology and Hepatology. Pearls of Wisdom. Boston, MA, Boston Medical Publishing Corporation, 2000;255-260.
- Schiano TD, Bodenheimer HC. Complications of chronic liver disease. In Friedman SL, McQuaid KR, Grendell JH (eds): Current Diagnosis and Treatment in Gastroenterology. 2nd edition, USA, McGraw-Hill 2003;639-663.
- Friedman SL, Schiano TD. Cirrhosis and Its Sequelae. In: Goldman L, Ausiello D (eds): Cecil Textbook of Medicine, 22nd edition, Philadelphia, Saunders 2004;936-44.
- Ehrenpreis ED, Schiano TD. Gut and hepatobiliary dysfunction: In Hall JB, Schmidt GA. Wood LDH (eds): Principles of critical care, 3rd edition, USA, McGraw-Hill, 2005;81:1247-1260.
- Schiano TD, Hunt K. Occupational and environmental hepatotoxicity: In Zakim D, Boyer TD: Hepatology. A textbook of liver disease, 5th edition. Saunders/Elsevier, Philadelphia, PA 2006;561-77.
- Liu LU, Schiano TD. Hepatotoxicity of herbal medicines, vitamins, and natural hepatotoxins. Drug-Induced Liver Disease, 2nd ed. Kaplowitz N and DeLeve LD (editors). Informa Healthcare USA, Inc. 2007;733-754.

== Publications ==
- Schiano, TD; Rhodes, R (Feb 2010). "The dilemma and reality of transplant tourism: an ethical perspective for liver transplant programs". Liver Transpl. 16 (2): 113–7. doi:10.1002/lt.21967. PMID 20104478. S2CID 1589162.
- Stanca, CM; Montazem, AH; Lawal, A; Zhang, JX; Schiano, TD (Jan 2010). "Intranasal desmopressin versus blood transfusion in cirrhotic patients with coagulopathy undergoing dental extraction: a randomized controlled trial". J Oral Maxillofac Surg. 68 (1): 138–43. doi:10.1016/j.joms.2009.07.081. PMID 20006168.
- Ward, SC; Schiano, TD; Thung, SN; Fiel, MI (Dec 2009). "Plasma cell hepatitis in hepatitis C virus patients post-liver transplantation: case-control study showing poor outcome and predictive features in the liver explant". Liver Transpl. 15 (12): 1826–33. doi:10.1002/lt.21949. PMID 19938116. S2CID 5291295.
- Massoumi, H; Elsiesy, H; Khaitova, V; Peterson, B; Norkus, E; Grewal, P; Liu, L; Chang, C; Bach, N; Schiano, TD (Sep 2009). "An escalating dose regimen of pegylated interferon and ribavirin in HCV cirrhotic patients referred for liver transplant". Transplantation. 88 (5): 729–35. doi:10.1097/TP.0b013e3181b2e0d1. PMID 19741473. S2CID 1680435.
- Tan, HH; Fiel, MI; Rio Martin, J; Schiano, TD (Jun 2009). "Graft rejection occurring in post-liver transplant patients receiving cytotoxic chemotherapy: a case series". Liver Transpl. 15 (6): 634–9. doi:10.1002/lt.21727. PMID 19479807.
- Fiel, MI; Wu, HS; Iyer, K; Rodriguez-Laiz, G; Schiano, TD (Sep 2009). "Rapid reversal of parenteral-nutrition-associated cirrhosis following isolated intestinal transplantation". J Gastrointest Surg. 13 (9): 1717–23. doi:10.1007/s11605-009-0914-7. PMID 19418102. S2CID 10695283.
- Hytiroglou, P; Gutierrez, JA; Freni, M; Odin, JA; Stanca, CM; Merati, S; Schiano, TD; Branch, AD; Thung, SN (Jun 2009). "Recurrence of primary biliary cirrhosis and development of autoimmune hepatitis after liver transplant: A blind histologic study". Hepatology Research. 39 (6): 577–84. doi:10.1111/j.1872-034X.2008.00483.x. PMC 3127546. PMID 19207586.
- Fiel, MI; Sauter, B; Wu, HS; Rodriguez-Laiz, G; Gondolesi, G; Iyer, K; Schiano, TD (Aug 2008). "Regression of hepatic fibrosis after intestinal transplantation in total parenteral nutrition liver disease". Clin Gastroenterol Hepatol. 6 (8): 926–33. doi:10.1016/j.cgh.2008.04.011. PMID 18674734.
- Wu, HS; Fiel, MI; Schiano, TD; Gil, J (Jul 2008). "Image segmentation of liver fibrosis". J Microsc. 231 (1): 70–80. doi:10.1111/j.1365-2818.2008.02018.x. PMID 18638191. S2CID 26807398.
- Killackey, MT; Gondolesi, GE; Liu, LU; Paramesh, AS; Thung, SN; Suriawinata, A; Nguyen, E; Roayaie, S; Schwartz, ME; Emre, S; Schiano, TD (Jun 2008). "Effect of ischemia-reperfusion on the incidence of acute cellular rejection and timing of histologic hepatitis C virus recurrence after liver transplantation". Transplant. Proc. 40 (5): 1504–10. doi:10.1016/j.transproceed.2008.03.101. PMID 18589139.
- Schiano, TD; Kim-Schluger, L; Gondolesi, G; Miller, CM (January 2001). "Adult living donor liver transplantation: the hepatologist's perspective". Hepatology. 33 (1): 3–9. doi:10.1053/jhep.2001.21489. PMID 11124813. S2CID 41918228.
- de Boccardo, G; Kim, JY; Schiano, TD; Maurette, R; Gagliardi, R; Murphy, B; Emre, S; Akalin, E (Jun 2008). "The burden of chronic kidney disease in long-term liver transplant recipients". Transplant. Proc. 40 (5): 1498–503. doi:10.1016/j.transproceed.2008.03.099. PMID 18589138.
- Schiano, TD; Rhodes, R (Jul 2008). "Ethics and liver transplantation: a new section in our journal". Liver Transpl. 14 (7): 1058–9. doi:10.1002/lt.21544. PMID 18581483.
- Fiel, MI; Agarwal, K; Stanca, C; Elhajj, N; Kontorinis, N; Thung, SN; Schiano, TD (Jun 2008). "Posttransplant plasma cell hepatitis (de novo autoimmune hepatitis) is a variant of rejection and may lead to a negative outcome in patients with hepatitis C virus". Liver Transpl. 14 (6): 861–71. doi:10.1002/lt.21447. PMID 18508382.
- Lawal, A; Ghobrial, R; Te, H; Artinian, L; Eastwood, D; Schiano, TD (Dec 2007). "Comparison of hepatitis C histological recurrence rates and patient survival between split and deceased donor liver transplantation". Transplant. Proc. 39 (10): 3261–5. doi:10.1016/j.transproceed.2007.08.106. PMID 18089367.
- Chang, CY; Singal, AK; Ganeshan, SV; Schiano, TD; Lookstein, R; Emre, S (Nov 2007). "Use of splenic artery embolization to relieve tense ascites following liver transplantation in a patient with paroxysmal nocturnal hemoglobinuria". Liver Transpl. 13 (11): 1532–7. doi:10.1002/lt.21317. PMID 17969202.
