= Nib Soehendra =

German surgeon (born 1942)

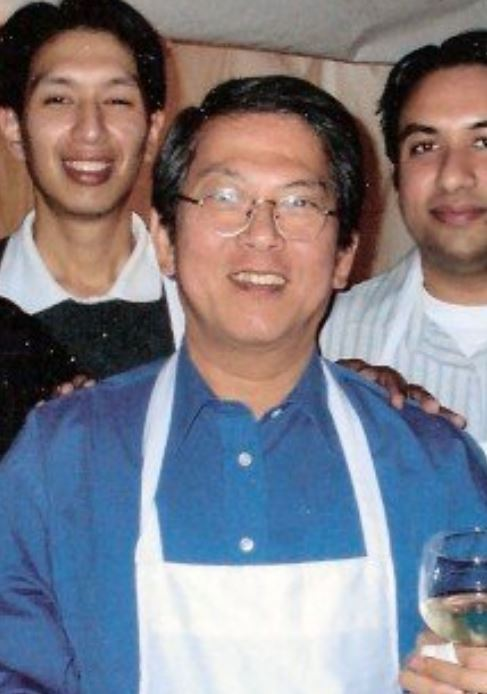
- Nib Soehendra in 2006
- Born: Keng-Bin Na; 1 October 1942 (age 83)
- Citizenship: German
- Education: University Medical Center Hamburg-Eppendorf (MD)
- Known for: Therapeutic endoscopy
- Awards: Paracelsus Medal of the German Medical Association (2016)
- Scientific career
- Fields: Medicine
- Workplaces: University of Hamburg; University Medical Center Hamburg-Eppendorf

Nib Soehendra (born October 1, 1942) is a German surgeon known for numerous contributions to the field of endoscopy and therapeutic endoscopy.

== Biography ==
Soehendra was born in Jakarta and emigrated at age 19 to Hamburg to begin studies in medicine at the University of Hamburg. He completed training in general surgery at Catholic Marien-Hospital in Hamburg, and at University Medical Center Hamburg-Eppendorf. It was at the latter institution that he worked closely with renowned gastrointestinal surgeon Hans-Wilhelm Schreiber. Soehendra initially began as an assistant surgeon at Catholic Marien-Hospital and then as a surgeon at University Medical Center Hamburg-Eppendorf.

Soehendra became interested in endoscopy, then a primarily diagnostic specialty. Soehendra's contributions were seminal in the development of the field of therapeutic endoscopy, the use of endoscopes to treat gastrointestinal conditions. Soehendra was appointed as Full Professor and Director of the Department of Endoscopic Surgery at University Hospital Eppendorf, Hamburg in 1989, and subsequently Director of Department of Interdisciplinary Endoscopy in 1999.

Soehendra chaired the endoscopy section of the German Society of Gastroenterology in 1990. He subsequently developed Endo Club Nord, a society for live endoscopy, wherein endoscopic procedures are performed live and presented to a large audience. Soehendra also served as President of the German Society of Endoscopy and Imaging Techniques. He also served on the advisory board of Endoscopy, the journal of the European Society of Gastrointestinal Endoscopy.

Soehendra retired from hospital practice in 2008 and since has continued in private practice.

== Research ==
Soehendra's contributions to therapeutic endoscopy were key in the transformation of the field from a primarily diagnostic test, to a therapeutic specialty. In 1980, he presented the first use of a biliary stent, a device inserted via endoscopic retrograde cholangiopancreatography (ERCP) to drain the common bile duct of obstruction. In addition to this, Soehendra developed a novel and now commonly used technique to treat bleeding gastric varices with the injection of cyanoacrylate.

Additional contributions include the development of numerous instruments, including the Soehendra biliary dilator, for dilation of strictures of the common bile duct; the mechanical lithotripter used to crush gallstones in the biliary system, and; the monofilament snare for resection of colorectal polyps. For his numerous contributions to the field, Soehendra is recognized as one of the pioneers of the field of therapeutic endoscopy.

== Honors ==
- President's Award of the American Society for Gastrointestinal Endoscopy, 2006
- Paracelsus Medal of the German Medical Association, 2016
