= Clinical and Translational Gastroenterology =

- Discipline: Gastroenterology
- Language: English
- Edited by: Brian Jacobson

Publication details
- History: 2010–present
- Publisher: Springer Nature
- Frequency: Monthly
- Open access: Yes
- Impact factor: 4.488 (2020)

Standard abbreviations
- ISO 4: Clin. Transl. Gastroenterol.

Indexing
- ISSN: 2155-384X
- LCCN: 2010203061
- OCLC no.: 630133569

Links
- Journal homepage; Online archive

Clinical and Translational Gastroenterology is a monthly peer-reviewed open access medical journal covering gastroenterology. It was established in 2010 and is published by Springer Nature on behalf of the American College of Gastroenterology, of which it is the official online journal. It is also the sister journal of the American Journal of Gastroenterology. According to the Journal Citation Reports, the journal has a 2020 impact factor of 4.488. According to 2018, it ranked 20th out of 84th in the category of Gastroenterology & Hepatology. and making it the highest-impact open access journal in this category.
