= Schiano =

Schiano is a surname. Notable people with the surname include:

- Greg Schiano, former head coach of the Tampa Bay Buccaneers
- Mario Schiano, Italian saxophonist
- Rita Schiano, American novelist
- Thomas D. Schiano, organ transplantation specialist
- Kristina Schiano, American drummer
