= John Nunn (disambiguation) =

John Nunn (born 1955) is an English chess grandmaster.

John Nunn may also refer to:

- John Nunn (sailor) (1803–1860), English sailor and author
- John Nunn (rower) (born 1942), American Olympic rower
- John Nunn (racewalker) (born 1978), American Olympic race walker
- John Nunn (RAF officer) (1919–2013), British Royal Air Force officer, mathematician, and politician
- John Nunn (cricketer) (1906–1987), English cricketer
- John F. Nunn, dean of the Royal College of Anaesthetists, 1979–1982
