= Endo Club Nord =

The Endo Club Nord was founded in 1991 as a practice-oriented forum for gastroenterological endoscopy by Nib Soehendra (University Medical Center Hamburg-Eppendorf), Dietmar Wurbs (Asklepios Clinic Barmbek) and Friedrich Hagenmüller (Asklepios Clinic Altona), who were its presidents until 1998. Today the two-day forum for doctors, nursing staff and students is the world’s largest congress with live endoscopy with over 2,500 participants yearly.
