= Kurnool Medical College =

College in Andhra Pradesh, India

- Other name: KMC
- Motto: Enter to Learn, Leave to Serve
- Type: Government Institution
- Established: 1956; 70 years ago
- Principal: Dr. Chitti Narasamma
- Undergraduates: 250 per year
- Location: Kurnool, Andhra Pradesh, India; 15°49′15.13″N 78°2′17.16″E
- Campus: Urban
- Website: www.kurnoolmedicalcollege.in

Kurnool Medical College, established in 1956, is one of the oldest medical schools in India, located in Kurnool, Andhra Pradesh.

== History ==
When Andhra State was formed in October 1953, the Government of Andhra decided to start a medical college in the Rayalaseema region of the state. In Government Order Ms. No. 1835, Health, dated 29 November 1955, the government of Andhra passed orders to establish a medical college, the third one in the state at Kurnool. As the building was not ready for the college the government decided to admit 50 students intended for Kurnool Medical College at Kurnool City in July 1956. When Andhra Pradesh was formed and the capital was shifted to Hyderabad from Kurnool the erstwhile secretariat building was handed over to the college.

The college was opened on 21 July 1956 by Sri T.T. Krishnamachari, the then Finance Minister of India. Fifty students were admitted to the M.B.B.S. course. Dr. C. Venkata Ramaiah was appointed as First Principal and Special Officer of Kurnool Medical College.

Laboratories for subjects of the non-clinical course were established in due course. The construction of a "clinical lecture hall-cum-clinical pathology laboratory" in the hospital and the construction of an air-conditioned mortuary for 24 dead bodies were undertaken latter and these buildings were ready by the summer of 1958.

New out-patient block of the Government General Hospital, Kurnool which is the associated teaching hospital was constructed at a cost of Rs900,000 and the inauguration of this and the clinical courses was performed on 28 January 1958 by Sri. D. K. Karmankar, the Health Minister of India. The first batch of second M.B.B.S. students from the batch of 50 students originally admitted to Guntur Medical college in July 1956 now joined this college for their clinical course. The first units in the major subjects of Medicine, Surgery and Midwifery were created in July 1957.

The Kurnool Medical College was first affiliated to Sri Venkateswara University, from January 1957 and permanently affiliated from January 1959.

The NCC unit attached to the college was started in January, 1958. Laboratory technician's courses and laboratory attender's courses were started in October 1959. In the same year, the Government also established at this college, a Regional Laboratory to serve the needs of Raayalaseema districts.

A well-planned Animal House with separate units for different laboratory animals was built and commissioned for use in 1961. A Central Work Shop started functioning from 1964.

The legislators' hostel, which was very close to, the college was given for locating the men's hostel during 1958 and it accommodated 175 students. Further expansion of this hostel was made to accommodate 350 students in all.

The then state guesthouse was also handed over by the government during 1958, and it is used as women's hostel. Additional accommodation is shown in the hospital premises in improved sheds as sub hostel for women. A new extension at a cost of 2 crores is nearly completed which will provide accommodation to 150 more women students and 56 women postgraduate students. So that it will be possible to accommodate women students at a single place. After the sub hostel for women students was vacated, it was proposed to give it to P.G. students. Afterwards new P.G. quarters were constructed with 75 single rooms.

The government of Andhra Pradesh passed orders sanctioning the transfer of government site adjoining the college compound to the Medical college to be used as a playground.

An Assembly-cum-library hall was constructed at a cost of Rs.1,500,000 in the year 1959. Expansion of the Anatomy Department was taken up and completed. A clinical research block at a cost of Rs.600,000 was taken up and completed and commissioned for use. Rural health center for the teaching of social and preventive medicine was opened at Parla village in 1960.

The college provides facilities for the following postgraduate degree/diploma courses. MS (Anatomy), MD (Physiology), MD (Biochemistry), MD (Pharmacology), MD (Microbiology), MD (Pathology), DCP, MD (Forensic Medicine), MD (SPM/Community Medicine), DPH, MS (ENT, DLO, MS (Ophthalmology), DO., MD (General Medicine), MS (General Surgery), DGO, MD (Gynecology), MD (TBCD), MD (STD), MD (Pediatrics), DCH, MD (Anesthesia), MD (Radiology), DMRD, MS (Orthopedics), and recently the Medical Council of India, New Delhi has inspected this college for recognition and starting of some superspeciality course i.e. DM (Neurology), DM (Gastroenterology), DM (Nephrology), M.Ch (Pediatrics Surgery), M.Ch (Neuro surgery), M.Ch (Plastic surgery), M.Ch (Cardio thoracic surgery), DM (Cardiology), M.Ch (Urology) etc. in this college. During the year 2003, Acute Medical Care (AMC) unit and ICCU unit are started in the Government General Hospital, Kurnool.

During the year 2001-02 and 2002-03 an examination hall of capacity 400 and an examination hall/lecture gallery of capacity 400 members was also constructed in the college for the increased seats. Renovation of the Physiology and Anatomy departments was done. Extra accommodation is also provided to the students in the hostels both for men and women. Construction work for the new mortuary building is also in progress and a new pathology laboratory is also provided.

During December 2006 and January 2007 students and faculty of this college were celebrating their Golden jubilee function. It marked the completion of 50 successful years after establishment. They invited Dr. Abdul Kalam, President of India to this program.

Kurnool Medical College held its golden jubilee celebrations. On 29 July 2016, its diamond jubilee celebrations began.

In the year 2020 Andhra Government has allocated Rs 720 Crores for the modernisation of Kurnool Government General Hospital under Naadu-Nedu programme. Officials concerned have also prepared designs and plans for new constructions to fast pace the work. Currently on an average the hospital draws around 3000 out-patients on daily basis. These patients belongs to Kurnool and nearby districts and from neighbouring states of Telangana and Karnataka. The 36 unit hospital currently has only 300 doctors for a 1,150 bed strength. With several current buildings being in bad shape and repair works pending for others there is a urgent need for construction of new buildings with modern technology. Additionally, recently a state level cancer institute has also been constructed in collaboration with Tata foundation in the premises. Once the modernisation work gets completed Kurnool Government General Hospital will become the largest health care centre in Andhra Pradesh.

== Notable alumni ==
- Dr. P. Jagannath
- Dattatreyudu Nori
- D. Nageshwar Reddy
- Sekhar Tam Tam, awarded Member of the Order of the British Empire (MBE) 2006 by Queen Elizabeth II for service as District Medical Officer in the British Caribbean island of Grenada. The MBE is awarded by the British monarchy for outstanding service and/or achievement in the British Empire.
- Babu Rao Mediyam, Member of Parliament.
- Sripada Pinakapani
- Dr. K. Venkatesh, MS (PGIMER) - Ex DME of undivided Andhra Pradesh state.
- Dr. Bharat Gupta- IAS(2010), Andhra Pradesh Cadre
