= Journal of Crohn's and Colitis =

- Discipline: Gastroenterology
- Language: English
- Edited by: Laurence J. Egan

Publication details
- History: 2007-present
- Publisher: Oxford University Press
- Frequency: Monthly
- Impact factor: 8.7 (2024)

Standard abbreviations
- ISO 4: J. Crohn's Colitis
- NLM: J Crohns Colitis

Indexing
- ISSN: 1873-9946 (print); 1876-4479 (web)

Links
- Journal homepage; Online archive

The Journal of Crohn's and Colitis is a monthly peer-reviewed medical journal covering inflammatory bowel diseases. It was established in 2007 and was originally published by Elsevier, but has been published by Oxford University Press since January 2015. It is the official journal of the European Crohn's and Colitis Organisation. The editor-in-chief is Laurence J. Egan (NUI Galway). According to the Journal Citation Reports, the journal has a 2024 impact factor of 8.7.
