= Paul Enck =

German psychologist

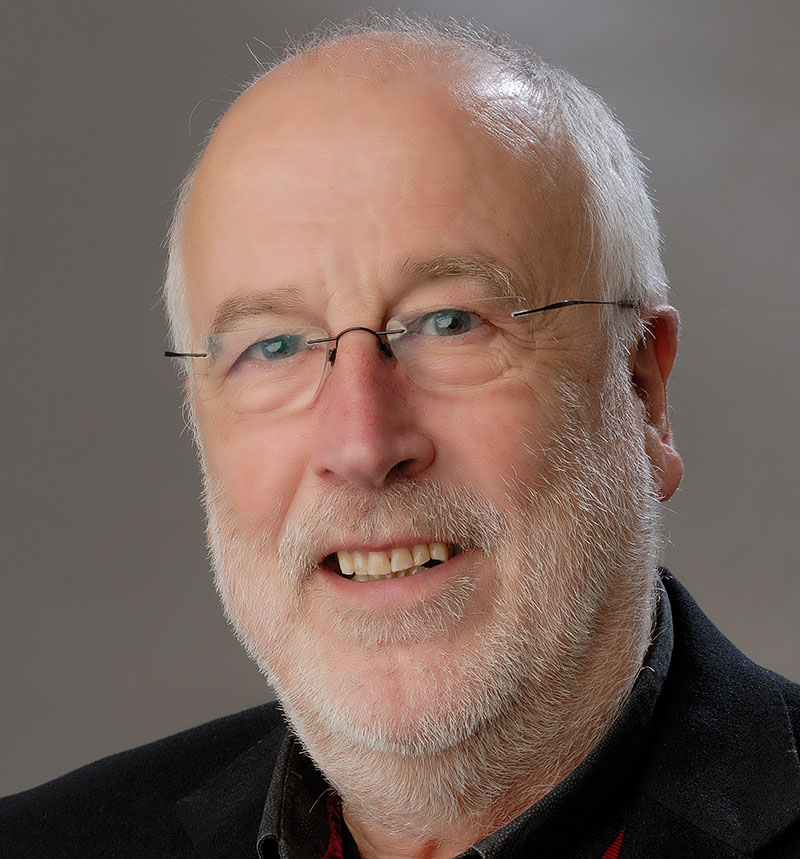
- Born: September 13, 1949 (age 77)
- Years active: 30+
- Medical career
- Profession: Psychologist
- Institutions: University of Tübingen
- Sub-specialties: Psychosomatic medicine

Paul Enck (born September 13, 1949) is Professor of Medical Psychology and was Head of Research at the Department of Psychosomatic Medicine and Psychotherapy, University Hospital Tübingen, Germany until 2014; since then, he holds a part-time research and consultant position at the department. His research interests were and still are psychophysiology and neurogastroenterology (i.e. stress research, pain research, biofeedback applications, cortical imaging, eating disorders, functional gastrointestinal disorders and placebo research). Since his semi-retirement in 2014, he added popular science writing in medicine and history to his activities.

== Education and work ==
Following studies in psychology at the Carl von Ossietzki University Oldenburg and a post-graduate training period at the Johns Hopkins University in Baltimore (USA) he received his doctorate (PhD) at the University of Tübingen in 1985. From 1985 to 1998 he worked as a clinical scientist at the University Hospital Düsseldorf, Department of Gastroenterology. In 1993 he promoted to Associate Professor (Privat-Dozent) at the University of Bochum, Germany. From October 1998 until December 2014, Professor Enck was Director of Research at the University Hospital Tübingen, first at the Department of General Surgery, since 2004 at the Department of Internal Medicine VI (Psychosomatic Medicine and Psychotherapy). In 2000, he was promoted to Professor at the University Medical School in Tübingen.

As of 2021, he has published more than 250 peer-reviewed data-papers in national and international journals, more than 350 reviews, book chapters, and editorials, and more than 100 popular science articles. In 2012 he received the Günter Jantschek research fellowship together with researchers of the University of Oslo.

== Research memberships ==
- German Society for Neurogastroenterology and Motility (DGNM)
- European Society for Neurogastroenterology & Motility (ESNM)
- German Society for Gastroenterology, Digestive and Metabolic Diseases (DGVS)

== Activities ==
- Past treasurer und honorary President of the German Society for Neurogastroenterology and Motility (DGNM)
- Founding member of MAGDA (independent patient information platform for functional gastrointestinal tract disorders)
- Past secretary (treasurer) of European Society for Neurogastroenterology and Motility (ESNM)

== Scientific Publications ==
- Publications of author Paul Enck on PubMed
- Paul Enck and Winfried Häuser: Beware the Nocebo Effect, The New York Times, published on 10 August 2012
