= Gastroenterology (journal) =

- Discipline: Gastroenterology
- Language: English
- Edited by: Richard M. Peek, Jr.

Publication details
- History: 1943–present
- Publisher: Elsevier on behalf of the American Gastroenterological Association (United States)
- Frequency: 14/year
- Impact factor: 22.682 (2020)

Standard abbreviations
- ISO 4: Gastroenterology

Indexing
- ISSN: 0016-5085

Links
- Journal homepage

Gastroenterology is the official medical journal of the American Gastroenterological Association. Its first issue was published in 1943. It is currently published by Elsevier. According to the Journal Citation Reports, the journal has a 2020 impact factor of 22.682, ranking it 4th among 92 journals in the category "Gasteroenterology & Hepatology".
