= The American Journal of Gastroenterology =

- Discipline: Gastroenterology
- Language: English
- Edited by: Jasmohan Bajaj, MD, MS, FACG & Millie Long, MD, MPH, FACG

Publication details
- Former name: Review of Gastroenterology
- History: 1934–present
- Publisher: Lippincott Williams & Wilkins (United States)
- Frequency: Monthly
- Impact factor: 12.045 (2021)

Standard abbreviations
- ISO 4: Am. J. Gastroenterol.

Indexing
- CODEN: AJGAAR
- ISSN: 0002-9270 (print); 1572-0241 (web)
- LCCN: 89640851
- OCLC no.: 01480140

Links
- Journal homepage

The American Journal of Gastroenterology is a peer-reviewed medical journal owned by the American College of Gastroenterology. It has been published by Lippincott Williams & Wilkins since 2019 and was previously published by Nature Research, Blackwell, and (before 2004) Elsevier.
