= Neurogastroenterology & Motility =

- Discipline: Neurogastroenterology
- Language: English
- Edited by: Gianrico Farrugia, Magnus Simren, Gary Mawe

Publication details
- Former name(s): Journal of Gastrointestinal Motility
- History: 1989-present
- Publisher: Wiley-Blackwell
- Frequency: Bimonthly
- Impact factor: 3.424 (2013)

Standard abbreviations
- ISO 4: Neurogastroenterol. Motil.

Indexing
- CODEN: NMOTEK
- ISSN: 1350-1925 (print); 1365-2982 (web)
- OCLC no.: 859674634

Links
- Journal homepage; Online access; Online archive

Neurogastroenterology & Motility is a bimonthly peer-reviewed medical journal covering neurogastroenterology and gastrointestinal motility. It was established in 1989 as the Journal of Gastrointestinal Motility, obtaining its current name in 1994, and is published by Wiley-Blackwell. It is the official journal of the European Society of Neurogastroenterology and Motility, as well as the American Neurogastroenterology and Motility Society. The editors-in-chief are Gianrico Farrugia (Mayo Clinic), Magnus Simren (Sahlgrenska University Hospital), and Gary Mawe (University of Vermont).

== Abstracting and indexing ==
The journal is abstracted and indexed in:

- Academic Search
- CAS: Chemical Abstracts Service
- CSA Biological Sciences Database
- Current Contents/Clinical Medicine
- Embase
- Index Medicus/MEDLINE/PubMed
- Neurosciences Abstracts
- Science Citation Index

According to the Journal Citation Reports, the journal has a 2013 impact factor of 3.424.
