= Ottawa Bowel Preparation Scale =

The Ottawa Bowel Preparation Scale is used to assess a patient's bowel preparation for colonoscopies.

== Scoring bowel preparation ==
The scale assesses three components of the large intestine: (1) the rectosigmoid colon, (2) the mid colon and (3) the right colon. A maximum score of 4 is used for each section of the large intestine. A score of 0 is given if the bowel preparation is excellent, meaning the mucosal detail is visible, there is no fluid and almost no stool. A score of 1 is given if the bowel preparation is good, meaning there is turbid fluid/stool but the mucosa is visible and wash/suction is not needed. A score of 2 is given if the bowel preparation is fair, meaning there is fluid/stool obscuring the mucosa, suction is needed but wash is not needed. A score of 3 is given if the bowel preparation is poor, meaning that stool obscures the mucosa and suctioning/washing only provides an OK mucosa view. A score of 4 is given if the bowel preparation is inadequate, meaning that stool obscures the mucosa despite major washing/suctioning. The total score is calculated by adding up all 3 scores. The scale has a range from 0 (perfect) to 14 (solid stool in each section and lots of fluid, i.e., a completely unprepared colon).

Other validated preparation scales are the Aronchick Scale and the Boston Bowel Preparation Scale.
