= Polyp =

Polyp may refer to:

- Polyp (zoology)
- Polyp (medicine)
- Polyp (cartoonist)
