= Clinical Gastroenterology and Hepatology =

- Discipline: Gastroenterology
- Language: English
- Edited by: Fasiha Kanwal

Publication details
- History: 2003-present
- Publisher: Elsevier on behalf of the American Gastroenterological Association (United States)
- Frequency: Monthly
- Impact factor: 13.576 (2021)

Standard abbreviations
- ISO 4: Clin. Gastroenterol. Hepatol.

Indexing
- CODEN: CGHLAW
- ISSN: 1542-3565 (print); 1542-7714 (web)
- OCLC no.: 51173884

Links
- Journal homepage; Online access; Online archive

Clinical Gastroenterology and Hepatology is a monthly peer-reviewed medical journal published by Elsevier on behalf of the American Gastroenterological Association. It was established in January 2003. According to the Journal Citation Reports, the journal has a 2021 impact factor of 13.576.
