= Therapeutic endoscopy =

Medical procedure

- Other names: interventional gastroenterology or interventional endoscopy or operative endoscopy

Therapeutic endoscopy is the medical term for an endoscopic procedure during which treatment is carried out via the endoscope. This contrasts with diagnostic endoscopy, where the aim of the procedure is purely to visualize a part of the gastrointestinal, respiratory or urinary tract in order to aid diagnosis. In practice, a procedure which starts as a diagnostic endoscopy may become a therapeutic endoscopy depending on the findings, such as in cases of upper gastrointestinal bleeding, or the finding of polyps during colonoscopy.

A number of different techniques have been developed to allow treatment to be carried out endoscopically, to treat disorders such as bleeding, strictures and polyps.

== Types of endoscopic therapy ==
=== Endoscopic haemostasis ===
Endoscopic injection of bleeding peptic ulcers with adrenaline has been practised since the 1970s, endoscopic heater probes have been used since the 1980s, and Argon plasma coagulation has been used since the 1990s. More recently, adrenaline injection tends to be combined with either heater probe coagulation or argon plasma coagulation to minimize the chance of an ulcer rebleeding. The disadvantage of this treatment is a low risk of perforation of the gastric wall and a low risk of peritonitis. Combined therapy may work better than epinephrine alone. However, there is no evidence that one kind of treatment is more effective than the other.

=== Injection sclerotherapy ===
Injection sclerotherapy has been used to treat oesophageal varices since the 1960s. A sheathed needle is passed through a channel in the endoscope, unsheathed and pushed into a varix. A sclerosing agent, such as ethanolamine or absolute alcohol, is then injected into the varix to cause scarring and constriction of the varix with the aim of obliterating the varix (or varices). This technique has now largely been superseded by variceal band ligation.

Sclerotherapy has also been used in the treatment of gastric varices since the late 1980s. In this case Histoacryl glue (cyanoacrylate) is commonly used as the sclerosant. This technique is favoured over band ligation because the position of the varices in the stomach, most often in the gastric fundus, makes the placing of bands very difficult.

=== Argon plasma coagulation ===
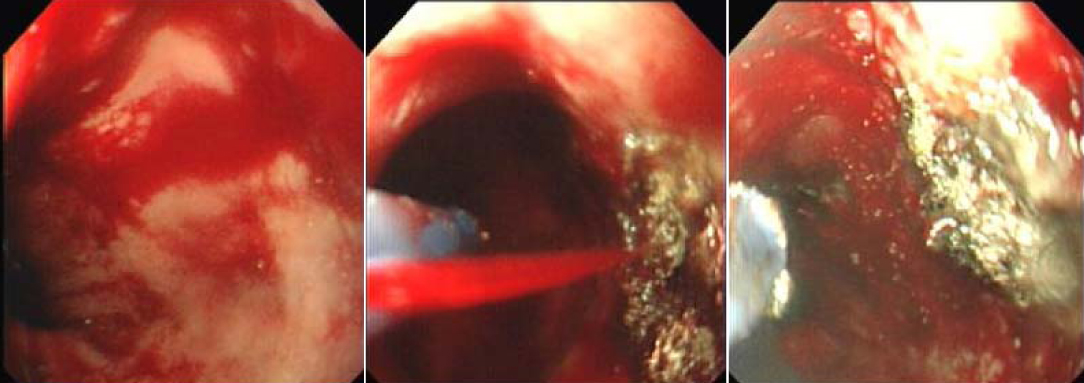
APC of bleeding oesophageal ulcer

Argon plasma coagulation (APC) has been used to provide tissue coagulation and haemostasis since the early part of the 1990s. A stream of argon gas is passed through an endoscopic catheter; this is then ionized at the tip of the catheter by an electric current. The tip of the catheter is held close to the tissue to be treated, and the current arcs across to the tissue causing a superficial (2–3 mm) burn. The lack of contact between the catheter and the tissue stops the tendency of the catheter to stick to the tissue, reducing unwanted tissue damage.

Its principal use is in providing haemostasis in gastrointestinal bleeding; angiodysplasia, GAVE, bleeding malignant tumours and bleeding peptic ulcers can all be treated. Trials have also been carried out to assess its use in eradicating Barrett's oesophagus, but have found that relapse is common.

=== Dilatation ===
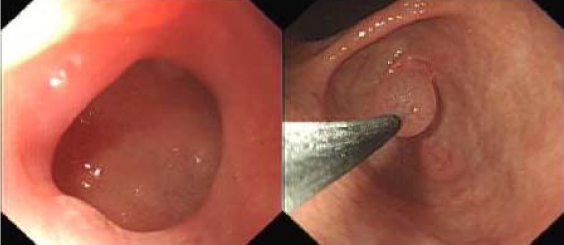
Pyloric stricture dilated with endoscopic balloon

Dilatation of benign oesophageal strictures using semi-rigid bougies existed long before the advent of flexible endoscopes. Since that time oesophageal dilatation has been carried out using either bougies or endoscopic balloons, and can be used to treat benign oesophageal strictures and achalasia.

Initially, bougies were used to dilate benign strictures of the oesophagus. These could be passed alongside the endoscope, allowing visualisation of the bougie passing through the stricture, but the technique of passing a guidewire through the stricture endoscopically, then removing the endoscope and passing the bougie over the guidewire was more commonly used.

More recently, balloon dilatation of the oesophageal strictures has become more common. It is thought that this technique carries a lower complication rate than the use of bougies, and since endoscopy balloons are single use items there are no concerns about equipment sterilization. In addition to oesophageal dilatation, endoscopic balloons can also be used to dilate pyloric strictures.

=== Polypectomy ===
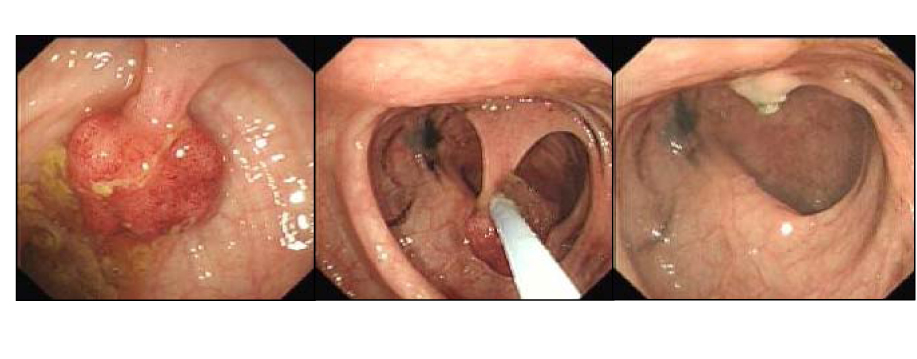
Polyp is identified, snare is passed over stalk and polyp is then removed

Endoscopic polypectomy has been carried out since the early 1970s by both endoscopic snare removal and fulguration of polyps with hot biopsy forceps.

=== Variceal banding ===
Oesophageal varices have been treated by band ligation since the late 1980s.

=== Stenting ===
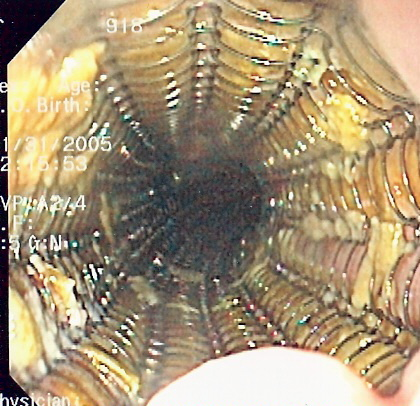
Expandable metal stent

Expandable mesh stents can be deployed in the oesophagus at endoscopy, primarily in patients with inoperable oesophageal cancer which is causing dysphagia.

Plastic stents can also be used to relieve obstruction of the common bile duct at ERCP.

=== Percutaneous endoscopic gastrostomy ===
A method for inserting a feeding gastrostomy tube without the need for surgery was first described in 1980. This endoscopic technique is of particular use as many patients who require feeding tubes (such as after patients with swallowing difficulties after a stroke) are at high risk for complications from anaesthesia and surgery; the endoscopic technique usually requires mild sedation only.

=== Foreign body removal ===
Foreign bodies commonly impact in the lower oesophagus, and removal of these by pushing them into the stomach has been practised since the Middle Ages. Foreign body retrieval, using forceps and magnets, has been practised since the time of rigid oesophagoscopy and bronchoscopy.

== Areas under development ==
=== Anti-reflux procedures ===
A number of techniques are being developed for the endoscopic treatment of gastro-oesophageal reflux disease as an alternative to laparoscopic Nissen fundoplication.

=== Treatment of Barrett's oesophagus ===
Endoscopic circumferential radiofrequency ablation is being developed in an effort to obviate long-term endoscopic surveillance in patients with Barrett's oesophagus, and to reduce the risk of development of oesophageal carcinoma. Previous techniques, such as Argon plasma coagulation, have been unsuccessful because of incomplete removal of the Barrett's mucosa and therefore relapse of part of the treated area. Newer techniques using circumferential radiofrequency ablation, which allows larger areas of the oesophagus to be treated at one time giving a more uniform area of treatment, are showing more promising short-term results.

=== Transoral gastroplasty (TOGA procedure) ===
Early trials are under way to evaluate an endoscopic technique for gastric stapling, a type of bariatric surgery, which aims to induce long-term weight loss in morbidly obese patients.
