= John F. Nunn =

Welsh physician and dean (1925–2022)

John Francis Nunn (7 November 1925 – 9 May 2022) was a British physician who was the dean of the Faculty of Anaesthetists, Royal College of Surgeons from 1979 to 1982.

Nunn was born in Colwyn Bay, Denbighshire, Wales, the son of Francis Nunn. He married Sheila Ernestine Doubleday in 1949.

== Selected publications ==
- Applied Respiratory Physiology: With Special Reference to Anaesthesia. Butterworths, London, c. 1969.
- Ancient Egyptian Medicine. British Museum Press, London, c. 1996. ISBN 0714109819
- The Tale of Peter Rabbit: Hieroglyph Edition. British Museum Press, London, 2005. ISBN 9780714119694
