= Endoscopy (journal) =

- Discipline: gastrointestinal endoscopy
- Language: English
- Edited by: Peter D. Siersema

Publication details
- History: Since 1961
- Publisher: Thieme Medical Publishers on behalf of the European Society of Gastrointestinal Endoscopy
- Frequency: Monthly
- Open access: Hybrid
- Impact factor: 12.8 (2024)

Standard abbreviations
- ISO 4: Endoscopy

Indexing
- CODEN: ENDCAM
- ISSN: 0013-726X (print); 1438-8812 (web)
- OCLC no.: 1604468

Links
- Journal homepage; Online access; Online archive

Endoscopy is a monthly peer-reviewed medical journal published by Thieme Medical Publishers. It is the official journal of the European Society of Gastrointestinal Endoscopy (ESGE). The journal covers all aspects of gastrointestinal endoscopy and also publishes ESGE guidelines. Since 2013, the editor-in-chief has been Peter D. Siersema (Erasmus MC).

== Abstracting and indexing ==
The journal is abstracted and indexed in Index Medicus/MEDLINE/PubMed, Current Contents/Clinical Medicine, Current Contents/Life Sciences, Science Citation Index Expanded, Embase, and Scopus. According to the Journal Citation Reports, the journal has a 2024 impact factor of 12.8.
