= Gastrointestinal Endoscopy =

- Discipline: Gastroenterology
- Language: English
- Edited by: Douglas G. Adler

Publication details
- Former name(s): Bulletin of the American Gastroscopic Society, Bulletin of Gastroscopy and Esophagoscopy, Bulletin of Gastrointestinal Endoscopy
- History: 1954–present
- Publisher: Elsevier on behalf of the American Society for Gastrointestinal Endoscopy (United States)
- Frequency: Monthly
- Impact factor: 10.396 (2021)

Standard abbreviations
- ISO 4: Gastrointest. Endosc.

Indexing
- CODEN: GAENBQ
- ISSN: 0016-5107 (print); 1097-6779 (web)
- OCLC no.: 01570459

Links
- Journal homepage; Online access

Gastrointestinal Endoscopy is a monthly peer-reviewed medical journal covering gastroenterology, especially as relating to endoscopy. It is published by Elsevier and the official publication of the American Society for Gastrointestinal Endoscopy. The editor-in-chief is Douglas G. Adler, MD, FASGE.

== History ==
The journal was established as the Bulletin of the American Gastroscopic Society, was continued as the Bulletin of Gastroscopy and Esophagoscopy from 1959 to 1961, then as the Bulletin of Gastrointestinal Endoscopy until 1965 when it obtained its current name.

== Abstracting and indexing ==
The journal is abstracted and indexed in Index Medicus/MEDLINE/PubMed, Current Contents/Clinical Medicine, Current Contents/Life Sciences, Science Citation Index, Embase, and Scopus. According to the Journal Citation Reports, the journal has a 2021 impact factor of 10.396.
