= American College of Gastroenterology =

Medical association of gastroenterologists

The American College of Gastroenterology (ACG) is a Bethesda, Maryland–based medical association of gastroenterologists and advanced practice providers working in gastroenterology (GI).

The association was founded in 1932 and holds annual meetings and regional postgraduate continuing education courses, establishes research grants, and publishes The American Journal of Gastroenterology, Clinical and Translational Gastroenterology and The ACG Case Reports Journal. More than 21,000 physicians from 86 countries are members of the ACG. The ACG provides its members with scientific information on digestive health and the etiology, symptomatology and treatment of GI disorders.

The 2025–2026 ACG President is William D. Chey, MD, MACG.

== See also ==
- Gastroenterology
- The American Journal of Gastroenterology
- American Gastroenterological Association
