= American Society for Gastrointestinal Endoscopy =

- Abbreviation: ASGE
- Formation: December 30, 1941
- Type: Professional association
- Headquarters: Downers Grove, Illinois
- Location: United States
- Coordinates: 41.8254°N 88.0321°W
- Budget: $17.8 million
- Website: www.asge.org
- Formerly called: American Gastroscopic Society

The American Society for Gastrointestinal Endoscopy (ASGE) is a professional organization of physicians dedicated to improving endoscopy. The ASGE is made up largely of gastroenterologists from the United States. Included in its membership are endoscopists from other medical specialties as well as from other countries. ASGE publishes the medical journal Gastrointestinal Endoscopy.

"The core purpose of the American Society for Gastrointestinal Endoscopy is to be the leader in advancing and promoting excellence in gastrointestinal endoscopy."

== History ==
American Society for Gastrointestinal Endoscopy was founded on December 30, 1941. Established as the American Gastroscopic Society, the organization changed its name in 1961 to the "American Society for Gastrointestinal Endoscopy." As of 2017, the budget for ASGE was about $17.8 million.

== Services ==
American Society for Gastrointestinal Endoscopy sponsors grants for research in gastroenterology and endoscopy.
