= Gastroenterology =

Branch of medicine focused on the digestive system and its disorders

- Illustration of the digestive system
- System: Gastrointestinal
- Significant diseases: Gastrointestinal cancers, Gastrointestinal bleeding, Liver cirrhosis, Gallstones, Gastroenteritis, Inflammatory bowel disease
- Significant tests: Colonoscopy, Stool test, Barium swallows, Endoscopy
- Specialist: Gastroenterologist
- Glossary: Glossary of medicine

Gastroenterologist
Occupation
- Names: Physician
- Occupation type: Specialty
- Activity sectors: Medicine

Description
- Education required: Doctor of Medicine (M.D.); Doctor of Osteopathic medicine (D.O.); Bachelor of Medicine, Bachelor of Surgery (M.B.B.S.); Bachelor of Medicine, Bachelor of Surgery (MBChB)
- Fields of employment: Hospitals, Clinics

Gastroenterology (from the Greek gastḗr- "belly", -énteron "intestine", and -logía "study of") is the branch of medicine focused on the digestive system and its disorders. The digestive system consists of the gastrointestinal tract, sometimes referred to as the GI tract, which includes the esophagus, stomach, small intestine and large intestine as well as the accessory organs of digestion which include the pancreas, gallbladder, and liver.

The digestive system functions to move material through the GI tract via peristalsis, break down that material via digestion, absorb nutrients for use throughout the body, and remove waste from the body via defecation. Physicians who specialize in the medical specialty of gastroenterology are called gastroenterologists or sometimes GI doctors.

Some of the most common conditions managed by gastroenterologists include gastroesophageal reflux disease, gastrointestinal bleeding, irritable bowel syndrome, inflammatory bowel disease (IBD) which includes Crohn's disease and ulcerative colitis, peptic ulcer disease, gallbladder and biliary tract disease, hepatitis, pancreatitis, colitis, colon polyps and cancer, nutritional problems, and many more.

== History ==
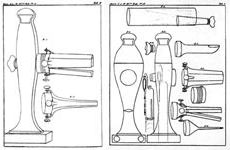
Drawings of Bozzini's "Lichtleiter", an early endoscope

Citing from Egyptian papyri, John F. Nunn identified significant knowledge of gastrointestinal diseases among practicing physicians during the periods of the pharaohs. Irynakhty, of the tenth dynasty, c. 2125 B.C., was a court physician specializing in gastroenterology, sleeping, and proctology.

Ancient Greeks attributed digestion to 'concoction,' theorizing that it was the result of the heat of the body acting upon food in the stomach, causing it to mature and ripen.

Galen's concept of the stomach having four faculties was widely accepted up to modernity in the seventeenth century.

=== 18th century ===
- Italian Lazzaro Spallanzani (1729–99) was among the early physicians to disregard Galen's theories, and in 1780 he gave experimental proof on the action of gastric juice on foodstuffs.
- In 1767, German Johann von Zimmermann wrote an important work on dysentery.
- In 1777, Maximilian Stoll of Vienna described cancer of the gallbladder.

=== 19th century ===
- In 1805, Philipp Bozzini made the first attempt to observe inside the living human body using a tube he named Lichtleiter (light-guiding instrument) to examine the urinary tract, the rectum, and the pharynx. This is the earliest description of endoscopy.
- Charles Emile Troisier described the enlargement of lymph nodes in abdominal cancer.
- In 1823, William Prout discovered that stomach juices contain hydrochloric acid.
- In 1833, William Beaumont published Experiments and Observations on the Gastric Juice and the Physiology of Digestion following years of experimenting on test subject Alexis St. Martin.
- In 1868, Adolf Kussmaul, a well-known German physician, developed the gastroscope. He perfected the technique on a sword swallower.
- In 1871, at the society of physicians in Vienna, Carl Stoerk demonstrated an esophagoscope made of two telescopic metal tubes, initially devised by Waldenburg in 1870.
- In 1876, Karl Wilhelm von Kupffer described the properties of some liver cells now called Kupffer cells.
- In 1883, Hugo Kronecker and Samuel James Meltzer studied oesophageal manometry in humans.

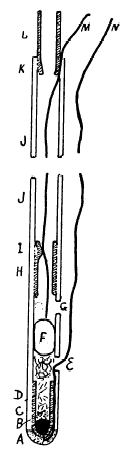
McClendon's pH-probe

=== 20th century ===
- In 1915, Jesse McClendon tested the acidity of the human stomach in situ.
- In 1921–22, Walter Alvarez did the first electrogastrography research.
- Rudolf Schindler described many important diseases involving the human digestive system during World War I in his illustrated textbook and is portrayed by some as the "father of gastroscopy". He and Georg Wolf developed a semiflexible gastroscope in 1932.
- In 1932, Burrill Bernard Crohn described Crohn's disease.
- In 1957, Basil Hirschowitz introduced the first prototype of a fibreoptic gastroscope.

=== 21st century ===
- In 2005, Barry Marshall and Robin Warren of Australia were awarded the Nobel Prize in Physiology or Medicine for their discovery of Helicobacter pylori (1982/1983) and its role in peptic ulcer disease. James Leavitt assisted in their research, but the Nobel Prize is not awarded posthumously so he was not included in the award.

== Disease classification ==
1. International Classification of Diseases (ICD 2007)/WHO classification:

- Chapter XI, Diseases of the digestive system,(K00-K93)

2. MeSH subject Heading:

- Gastroenterology (G02.403.776.409.405)
- Gastroenterological diseases(C06.405)

3. National Library of Medicine Catalogue (NLM classification 2006):

- Digestive system(W1)

== Procedures ==
=== Colonoscopy ===
Diagram of a colonoscopy procedure

A procedure using a long thin tube with a camera passed through the anus to visualize the rectum and the entire length of the colon. It is performed to screen for colon polyps and colorectal cancer, or to evaluate symptoms such as rectal bleeding, dark stools, changes in bowel habits, abdominal pain, and unexplained weight loss. During the procedure, the patient is usually sedated and the colon is examined for polyps, bleeding, or abnormal tissue; a biopsy or polyp removal (polypectomy) may be performed. The procedure typically takes 30–60 minutes, followed by a brief observation period. Complications can include bloating, cramping, reaction to anesthesia, bleeding, and perforation of the colon.

=== Sigmoidoscopy ===
Sigmoidoscopy

A procedure similar to a colonoscopy using a long thin tube with a camera (scope) passed through the anus but only intended to visualize the rectum and the last part of the colon closest to the rectum. All aspects of the procedure are the same as for a colonoscopy with the exception that this procedure only lasts ten to twenty minutes and is done without sedation. This usually allows for the patient to return to normal activities immediately after the procedure is finished.

=== Esophagogastroduodenoscopy (EGD) ===
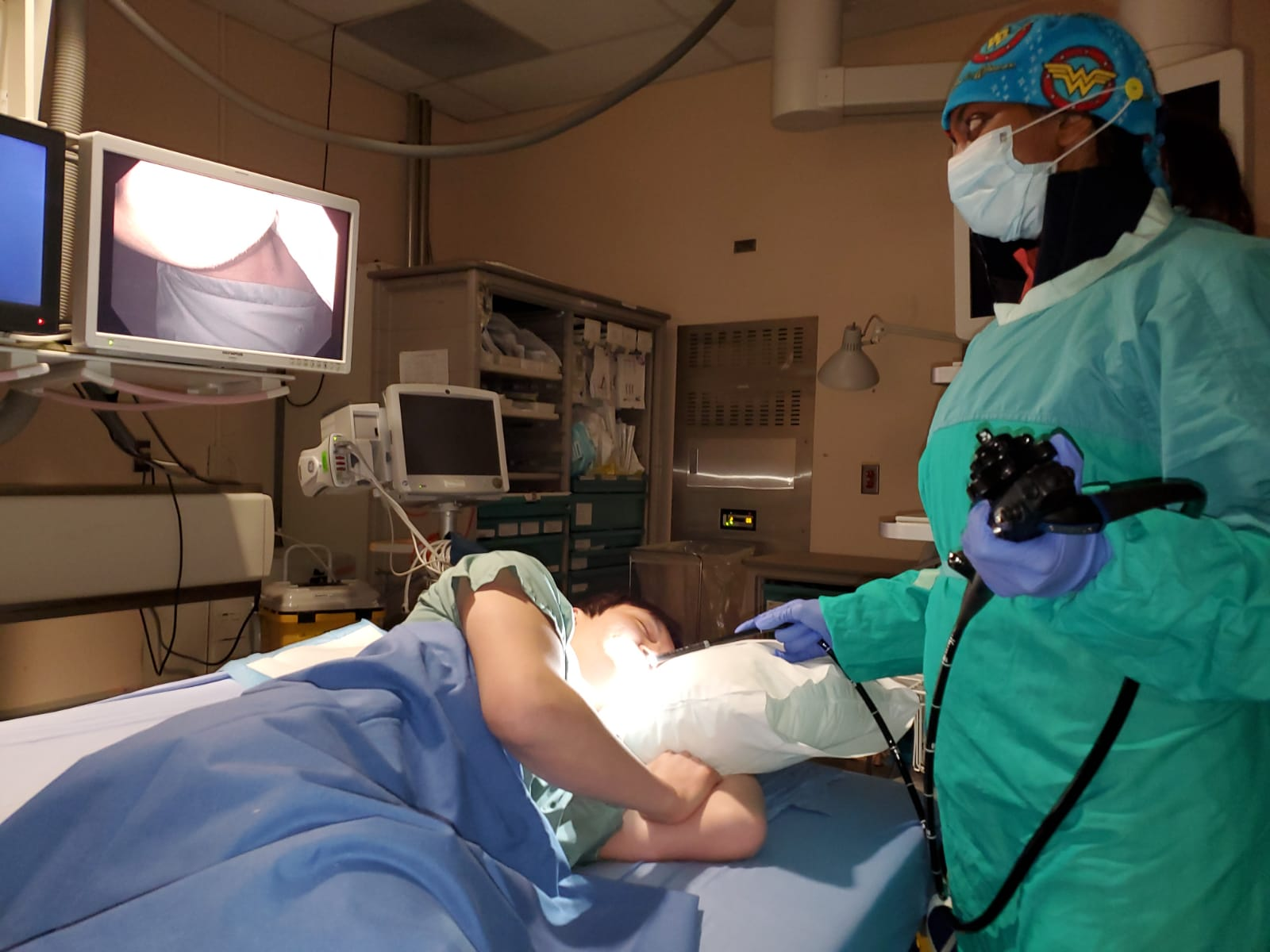
Endoscopy

A flexible endoscope is passed through the mouth to examine the esophagus, stomach, and duodenum. EGD is used to evaluate symptoms such as persistent heartburn, difficulty swallowing, upper-GI bleeding (e.g., vomiting blood or black stools), unexplained anemia or weight loss, and abnormal imaging or lab results. The procedure allows direct visualization, biopsy for histology, and therapies including banding of esophageal varices and dilation of strictures. Most examinations take about 15–30 minutes. Common transient effects are bloating and a sore throat; uncommon risks include reactions to sedation, bleeding, and perforation of the esophagus, stomach, or duodenum.

=== Endoscopic Retrograde Cholangiopancreatography (ERCP) ===
ERCP

A procedure using a long thin tube with a camera passed into the first part of the small intestine to locate, diagnose, and treat disorders of the bile and pancreatic ducts. These ducts can be narrowed or blocked by gallstones, infection, inflammation, pancreatic pseudocysts, or tumors, causing symptoms such as back pain or jaundice and laboratory findings such as elevated bilirubin. Under fluoroscopic guidance, contrast is injected into the ducts to visualize the anatomy; treatments can include sphincterotomy, stone extraction, dilation of strictures, stent placement, and tissue biopsy. Complications may include pancreatitis, infection (e.g., Ascending cholangitis), bleeding, reaction to anesthesia, and perforation of the duodenum or ducts.

== Disorders ==
=== Esophagus ===
==== Gastroesophageal reflux disease (GERD) ====
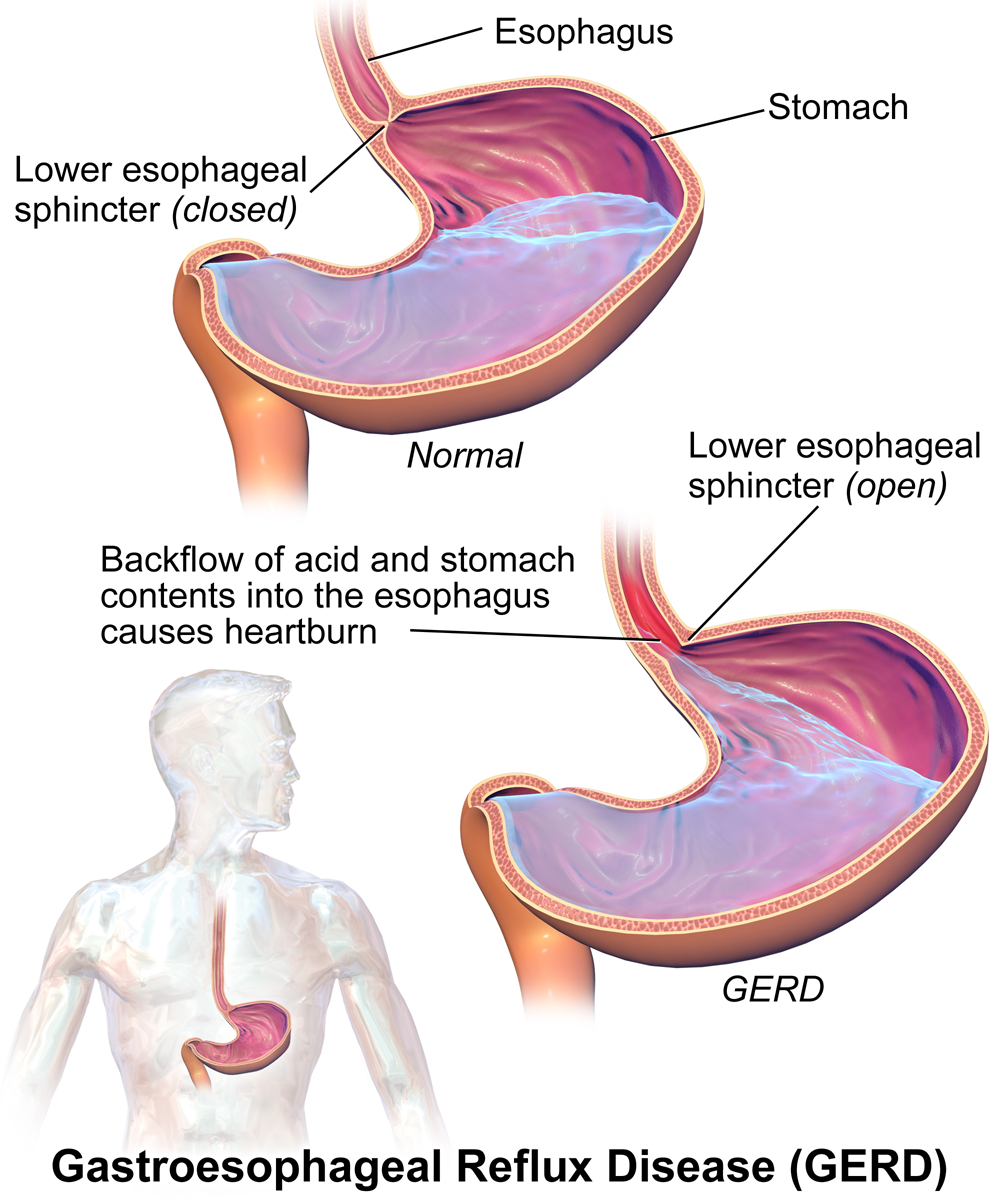
Gastroesophageal reflux

A condition that is a result of stomach contents consistently coming back up into the esophagus causing troublesome symptoms or complications. Symptoms are considered troublesome based on how disruptive they are to a patient's daily life and well-being. This definition was standardized by the Montreal Consensus in 2006. Symptoms include a painful feeling in the middle of the chest and feeling stomach contents coming back up into the mouth. Other symptoms include chest pain, nausea, difficulty swallowing, painful swallowing, coughing, and hoarseness. Risk factors include obesity, pregnancy, smoking, hiatal hernia, certain medications, and certain foods. Diagnosis is usually based on symptoms and medical history, with further testing only after treatment has been ineffective. Further diagnosis can be achieved by measuring how much acid enters the esophagus or looking into the esophagus with a scope. Treatment and management options include lifestyle modifications, medications, and surgery if there is no improvement with other interventions. Lifestyle modifications include not lying down for three hours after eating, lying down on the left side, elevating head while laying by elevating head of the bed or using extra pillows, losing weight, stopping smoking, and avoiding coffee, mint, alcohol, chocolate, fatty foods, acidic foods, and spicy foods. Medications include antacids, proton pump inhibitors, H2 receptor blockers. Surgery is usually a Nissen fundoplication and is performed by a surgeon. Complications of longstanding GERD can include inflammation of the esophagus that may cause bleeding or ulcer formation, narrowing of the esophagus leading to swallowing issues, a change in the lining of the esophagus that can increase the chances of developing cancer (Barrett's esophagus), chronic cough, asthma, inflammation of the larynx leading to hoarseness, and wearing away of tooth enamel leading to dental issues.

==== Barrett's esophagus ====
A condition in which the lining of the esophagus changes to look more like the lining of the intestine and increases the risk of developing esophageal cancer. There are no specific symptoms although symptoms of GERD may be present for years prior as it is associated with a 10–15% risk of Barrett's esophagus. Risk factors include chronic GERD for more than 5 years, being age 50 or older, being non-Hispanic white, being male, having a family history of this disorder, belly fat, and a history of smoking. Diagnosis can be made by looking into the esophagus with a scope and possibly taking a biopsy of the lining of the esophagus. Treatment includes managing GERD, destroying abnormal parts of the esophagus, removing abnormal tissue in the esophagus, and removing part of the esophagus as performed by a general surgeon. Further management could include periodic surveillance with repeat scopes at certain intervals determined by the physician, likely not more frequently than every three to five years. Complications from this disorder can result in a type of cancer called esophageal adenocarcinoma.

== Education and training ==
=== United States ===
Gastroenterology is a subspecialty of internal medicine and therefore requires three years of internal medicine residency training followed by three additional years in a dedicated gastroenterology fellowship. This training is certified by the American Board of Internal Medicine (ABIM) and the American Osteopathic Board of Internal Medicine (AOBIM) and must be completed at a program accredited by the Accreditation Council for Graduate Medical Education (ACGME). Other national societies that oversee training include the American College of Gastroenterology (ACG), the American Gastroenterological Association (AGA), and the American Society for Gastrointestinal Endoscopy (ASGE).

== Scope of practice ==
Gastroenterologists see patients both in the clinic and the hospital setting. They can order diagnostic tests, prescribe medications, and perform a number of diagnostic and therapeutic procedures including colonoscopy, esophagogastroduodenoscopy (EGD), endoscopic retrograde cholangiopancreatography (ERCP), endoscopic ultrasound (EUS), and liver biopsy.

In gastroenterology, as in other specialties, telehealth has led to a reshaping of healthcare systems by introducing new ways of providing care, facilitating access to services throughout the entire countries.

=== Subspecialties ===
Some gastroenterology trainees will complete a "fourth-year" (although this is often their seventh year of graduate medical education) in transplant hepatology, advanced interventional endoscopy, inflammatory bowel disease, motility, or other topics.

Advanced endoscopy, sometimes called interventional or surgical endoscopy, is a sub-specialty of gastroenterology that focuses on advanced endoscopic techniques for the treatment of pancreatic, hepatobiliary, and gastrointestinal disease. Interventional gastroenterologists typically undergo an additional year of rigorous training in advanced endoscopic techniques including endoscopic retrograde cholangiopancreatography, endoscopic ultrasound-guided diagnostic and interventional procedures, and advanced resection techniques including endoscopic mucosal resection and endoscopic submucosal dissection. Additionally, the performance of endoscopic bariatric procedures is also performed by some advanced endoscopists.

Hepatology, or hepatobiliary medicine, encompasses the study of the liver, pancreas, and biliary tree, and is traditionally considered a sub-specialty of gastroenterology, while proctology encompasses disorders of the anus, rectum, and colon and is considered a sub-specialty of general surgery.

== Professional organizations ==
- American College of Gastroenterology (ACG) - was founded in 1932 by a group of 10 gastroenterologists in New York City and now consists of over 16,000 gastroenterologists from 86 countries. The ACG sponsors conferences regionally and nationally, publishes several journals including The American Journal of Gastroenterology, Clinical and Translational Gastroenterology, and ACG Case Reports Journal, hosts continuing medical education (CME) programs, supports initiatives for fellows-in-training, develops and promotes evidence-based guidelines, supports advocacy and public policy, and provides clinical research funding consisting of $27 million in research grants and career development awards ($2.2 million in 2022).
- American Gastroenterological Association (AGA) - was founded in 1897 and now includes over 16,000 members worldwide. Their mission statement reads "Empowering clinicians and researchers to improve digestive health." The AGA publishes two journals monthly titled Gastroenterology and Clinical Gastroenterology and Hepatology, sponsors an annual meeting called Digestive Disease Week (DDW), provides more than $3 million each year in research grants to over 50 investigators through the AGA Research Foundation Awards Program ($2.56 million to 61 investigators in 2022), develops and promotes evidence-based guidelines, influences public policy through AGA's Congressional Advocates Program and the AGA political action committee (PAC), and supports a variety of educational opportunities including those that qualify for continuing medical education (CME) and maintenance of certification (MOC) credits.
- American Society for Gastrointestinal Endoscopy (ASGE) - was founded in 1941 and now includes around 15,000 members worldwide. Their mission statement reads "The American Society for Gastrointestinal Endoscopy is the global leader in advancing digestive care through education, advocacy and promotion of excellence and innovation in endoscopy." The ASGE publishes a monthly journal titled Gastrointestinal Endoscopy (GIE), develops and promotes evidence-based guidelines, offers educational resources for its members, and provides advocacy resources for influencing public policy.
- World Gastroenterology Organisation (WGO) - was founded in 1958 and consists of 119 Member Societies and 4 regional affiliated associations from around the world which represents a combined 60,000 individuals. The WGO mission statement reads "To promote, to the general public and healthcare professional alike, an awareness of the worldwide prevalence and optimal care of gastrointestinal and liver disorders, and to improve care of these disorders, through the provision of high quality, accessible and independent education and training." The WGO publishes a newsletter titled the electronic World Gastroenterology News (e-WGN), develops global guidelines, engages in advocacy through World Digestive Health Day (WDHD) held yearly on 29 May, and provides educational resources including 23 training centers around the world and a Train the Trainers (TTT) program.
- British Society of Gastroenterology
- United European Gastroenterology The United European Gastroenterology (UEG) was formally established in 1992. Over the years, UEG has grown significantly, establishing itself as a leading and prestigious medical specialty organization worldwide. UEG's mission is to advance the field of digestive diseases through prevention, research, diagnosis, treatment, and increased awareness. It unites over 50,000 professionals, including members from national and specialist societies, individual experts, and scientists in digestive health. UEG organizes the annual UEG Week, a major international gastroenterology congress. It also focuses on education, research support, and advocating for clinical standards and public health policies related to digestive diseases in Europe. UEG publishes the UEG Journal and the UEG White Book, which analyzes the burden and economic impact of digestive diseases in Europe.

== Academic journals ==
- The American Journal of Gastroenterology
- Clinical Gastroenterology and Hepatology
- Endoscopy
- Gastroenterology
- Gastrointestinal Endoscopy
- Gut
- Inflammatory Bowel Diseases
- Journal of Clinical Gastroenterology
- Journal of Crohn's and Colitis
- Neurogastroenterology & Motility
- World Journal of Gastroenterology
