= American Gastroenterological Association =

Medical association of gastroenterologists

- Formation: 1897; 129 years ago
- Type: Professional association
- Headquarters: 4930 Del Ray Avenue, Bethesda, Maryland
- Location: United States
- Official language: English
- President: Lawrence Kim, MD, AGAF
- Website: www.gastro.org

The American Gastroenterological Association (AGA) is a medical association of gastroenterologists.

== Overview ==
The American Gastroenterological Association is a professional association for gastroenterologists. AGA was founded in 1897 and has grown to include members worldwide who are involved in all aspects of the science, practice, and advancement of gastroenterology. The AGA Institute administers the practice, research and educational programs of the organization.

The AGA, a 501(c)(6) organization, administers all membership and public policy activities, while the AGA Institute, a 501(c)(3) organization, runs the organization's practice, research, and educational programs.

On a monthly basis, the AGA Institute publishes two journals, Gastroenterology and Clinical Gastroenterology and Hepatology.

The organization's annual meeting is Digestive Disease Week, which is held each May and is the largest international gathering of physicians, researchers and academics in the fields of Gastroenterology, Hepatology, Endoscopy and Gastrointestinal surgery.

The AGA Research Foundation provides digestive disease research grants on behalf of the AGA Institute
