= Lymphocytic esophagitis =

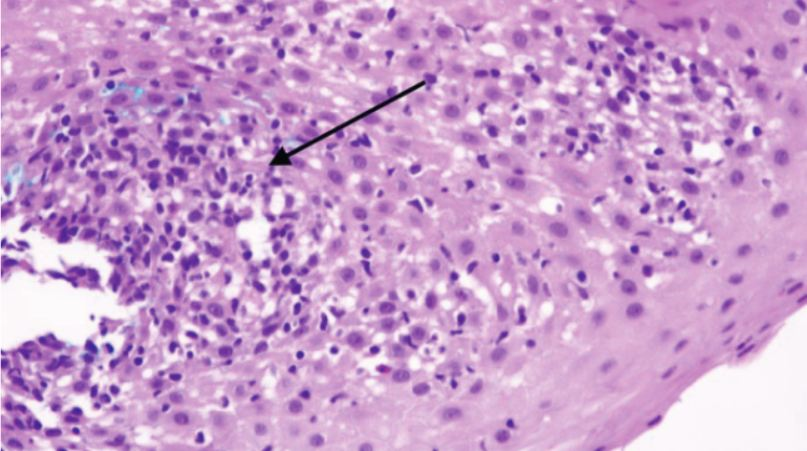
- Pathology image of lymphocytic esophagitis (H&E stain). The image demonstrates common findings in the condition: dense peripapillary lymphocytic infiltrate with spongiosis (arrow), and absence of neutrophils and eosinophils.
- Specialty: Gastroenterology
- Symptoms: difficulty swallowing, heartburn, abdominal pain, food bolus obstruction
- Complications: esophageal stricture
- Usual onset: unknown
- Duration: long term
- Causes: unknown
- Diagnostic method: biopsy of the esophagus showing characteristic findings
- Differential diagnosis: gastroesophageal reflux disease, eosinophilic esophagitis
- Medication: corticosteroids, such as prednisone and budesonide
- Prognosis: unknown
- Frequency: uncertain; adults 0.1%, as high as 8.5% in children

Lymphocytic esophagitis is a rare and poorly understood medical disorder involving inflammation in the esophagus. The disease is named from the primary inflammatory process, wherein lymphocytes are seen within the esophageal mucosa. Symptoms of the condition include difficulty swallowing, heartburn and food bolus obstruction. The condition was first described in 2006 by Rubio and colleagues. Initial reports questioned whether this was a true medical disorder, or whether the inflammation was secondary to another condition, such as gastroesophageal reflux disease.

The cause of lymphocytic esophagitis is unknown. The disease may cause different symptoms and be caused by different processes in childhood as compared to adulthood. Some studies have shown that it is associated with either other medical conditions involving the esophagus, including gastroesophageal reflux disease and achalasia, or other inflammatory conditions such as Crohn's disease, coeliac disease, and allergic conditions. The diagnosis is based upon a biopsy of the mucosa of the esophagus, showing a characteristic appearance of inflammation involving lymphocytes, and the relative absence of another group of inflammatory cells, granulocytes.

Complications of the disorder include stricture of the esophagus, which can lead to food bolus obstruction, and weight loss. Treatment of lymphocytic esophagitis includes medications meant to target the esophagus topically, such as budesonide, but also procedures to deal with complications, such as esophageal dilation.

== Signs and symptoms ==
The most common symptom of lymphocytic esophagitis is dysphagia, or difficulty swallowing, prevalent in 53 to 57% of individuals with the condition due to inflammation, narrowing or altered movement of the esophagus. Other symptoms include heartburn, abdominal pain, nausea and food bolus obstruction. Some patients may have no symptoms, as was found in a significant percentage of patients in the first description of the condition, although more recent reports indicate that the absence of symptoms is uncommon.

=== Complications ===
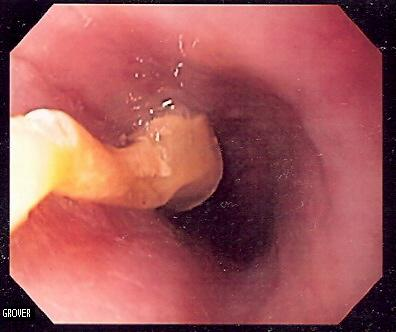
Image of a piece of food obstructing the esophagus, a complication in lymphocytic esophagitis

Food bolus impaction is a common complication of lymphocytic esophagitis. This occurs when food is acutely obstructing the esophagus at an area of narrowing and may require an endoscopic procedure in order to remove or dislodge the obstructing food.

== Cause ==
The cause of lymphocytic esophagitis is unknown. Attempts to better understand the cause of lymphocytic esophagitis include identification of other diseases that associate with the condition. These conditions include other esophageal conditions including gastroesophageal reflux disease and achalasia, as well as other inflammatory diseases such as Crohn's disease, coeliac disease, and allergic conditions such as eczema. Additionally use of tobacco may associate with lymphocytic esophagitis. Lymphocytic esophagitis does not occur with high frequency in other gastrointestinal conditions where lymphocytosis is found in the mucosa, including lymphocytic colitis and lymphocytic gastritis; however, there is a disease association with coeliac disease wherein lymphocytic inflammation occurs in the small bowel after exposure to gluten.

== Pathophysiology ==
Little is known about the pathophysiology of lymphocytic esophagitis. It has been hypothesized that lymphocytic esophagitis may be either a primary inflammatory disorder, or that the inflammation is triggered by an external stimulus leading to injury of the mucosal lining of the esophagus, such as gastric acid in GERD.

== Diagnosis ==
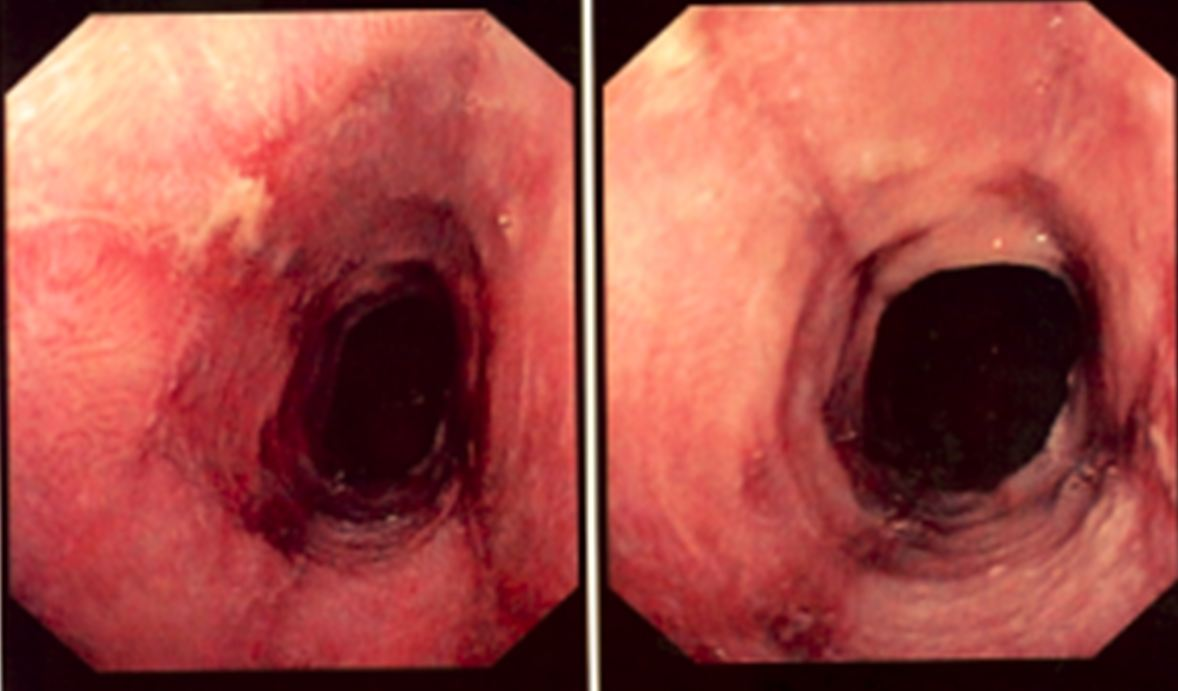
Endoscopic image of lymphocytic esophagitis, demonstrating narrow lumen esophagus (left), linear furrows (right) and esophageal rings (right)

The diagnosis of lymphocytic esophagitis is made by biopsy of the mucosal lining of the esophagus. This is typically achieved at the time of esophagogastroduodenoscopy, a medical procedure wherein an endoscope is inserted through the mouth, into the esophagus, in order to visualize and biopsy the mucosa.

While the histologic changes in the biopsies are characterized by the presence of an inflammatory infiltrate, consisting primarily of lymphocytes in the absence of other inflammatory cells such as granulocytes, the criteria for making the diagnosis are still unclear. The location of the biopsies, cutoff of number of lymphocytes found in each high-power field of view of the microscope, the presence of spongiosis, and the need for immunohistochemical staining to define lymphocytes are all unclear still.

While the diagnosis of lymphocytic esophagitis depends on the biopsy results, certain changes can be visualized directly at the time of endoscopy. The esophagus may be narrow in calibre, may show multiple rings, redness, linear furrows or the mucosal lining may slide demonstrating a "crepe-paper" appearance. Complications such as strictures of the esophagus can also be detected with endoscopy. These changes are very similar to those found in eosinophilic esophagitis, a more common and better understood esophageal disorder thought to be of allergic origin. Narrow-band imaging with magnification endoscopy is another imaging modality that can show characteristic changes of lymphocytic esophagitis.

== Management ==
The treatment of lymphocytic esophagitis is still undefined. Treatment either targets symptoms, inflammation or complications. For example, heartburn is a symptom in lymphocytic esophagitis, and proton pump inhibitors, which reduce acidity in the stomach, are consequently used for treatment. With respect to treatment of inflammation, steroids that are topical and coat the lining of the esophagus, such as budesonide have been used to treat the condition, in one German study. Prednisone has also been used to treat the inflammation of lymphocytic esopahgitis. With respect to complications, strictures of the esophagus can be treated with esophageal dilation.

== Prognosis ==
There has been little studied about the natural history of lymphocytic esophagitis. The longest study of the condition involved a median follow-up of 3.3 years, wherein participants were surveyed, and demonstrated that 87% of patients were alive but that the vast majority (97%) of patients still had symptoms. There have been two reports of esophageal perforation associated with the condition, one case occurring during endoscopic treatment of complications.

== Epidemiology ==
The percentage of individuals with lymphocytic esophagitis is uncertain. Early studies indicated that the prevalence was 0.1% in adults. However, reports in children indicate a higher prevalence of 8.5%, perhaps suggestive of incidental findings of lymphocytes in endoscopies performed for other reasons. The disease may occur more frequently in women over the age of 60.

There is increasing awareness of lymphocytic esophagitis among physicians, perhaps affecting the prevalence over time. The majority of the studies on lymphocytic esophagitis are after 2015.

== History ==
The condition was first described in a series of 20 patients at the Karolinska Institutet by Carlos Rubio in 2006. Much of the reports of the condition over the subsequent several years were focused on ascertaining whether lymphocytic esophagitis was a true condition, and if it was, establishing uniform criteria for its diagnosis.

== Research ==
The majority of the research into lymphocytic esophagitis has been performed after 2015. There remain many questions unanswered about the condition, such as establishing its natural history, clarifying its diagnostic criteria, and ascertaining the best treatment for the condition.

== See also ==
- Esophagitis
