= Myotomy =

Surgical procedure to cut muscles

- ICD-10-PCS: 0D787ZZ
- ICD-9-CM: 42.42
- [edit on Wikidata]

Myotomy is a surgical procedure that involves cutting a muscle to relieve constriction, often performed in the gastrointestinal or urological systems. The procedure can alleviate symptoms caused by muscle-related functional obstructions, particularly in cases of achalasia, a disorder that affects the esophagus. Myotomies may be performed using open, laparoscopic, or endoscopic techniques, depending on the location and condition being treated. Common types include the Heller myotomy, used to treat esophageal achalasia, and pyloromyotomy, commonly performed in infants with pyloric stenosis.

== Indications ==
Myotomy is indicated in various conditions characterized by muscular constriction that interferes with normal physiological functions. The most common indications include:

- Achalasia – A motility disorder where the lower esophageal sphincter (LES) fails to relax, obstructing food passage.
- Pyloric stenosis – Hypertrophy of the pyloric sphincter in infants, preventing food from entering the small intestine.
- Diffuse esophageal spasm – A condition causing uncoordinated esophageal contractions, resulting in swallowing difficulties.

== Types of myotomy ==
There are several types of myotomy procedures:

- Heller myotomy: Commonly used for treating achalasia, Heller myotomy involves cutting the muscle layers of the LES. A minimally invasive, laparoscopic approach is preferred, often combined with a partial fundoplication to prevent gastroesophageal reflux (GERD) post-surgery.
- Pyloromyotomy: Performed to treat pyloric stenosis, particularly in infants. This procedure involves cutting the hypertrophied pyloric muscle to enable normal gastric emptying.

== Surgical techniques ==
Myotomies can be performed using different surgical approaches:

- Laparoscopic Myotomy: A minimally invasive approach using a camera and small instruments. Laparoscopic myotomies have shorter recovery times, reduced postoperative pain, and lower chances of complications.
- Endoscopic Myotomy (POEM): Peroral endoscopic myotomy, or POEM, is a recent technique for achalasia that is entirely endoscopic, eliminating the need for external incisions. This technique is particularly useful for patients who may not tolerate traditional surgery.

== Postoperative care and recovery ==
Following a myotomy, patients generally experience improvement in symptoms, though the degree of recovery depends on the underlying condition and surgical approach. For example, after a Heller myotomy, patients often undergo a modified diet and may need follow-up studies such as a barium swallow to ensure effective swallowing. Gastroesophageal reflux may occur, particularly if fundoplication is not performed. Patients are typically monitored for complications, such as bleeding, infection, or mucosal tears, particularly in endoscopic procedures.

== Complications ==
While generally safe, myotomy procedures have potential complications, including:

- GERD: Common in esophageal myotomies, especially if fundoplication is not included.
- Esophageal perforation: Particularly a concern in endoscopic procedures like POEM.
- Infection and bleeding: Common issues in surgical procedures.

== See also ==
- Achalasia
- Esophagectomy
- Gastroesophageal reflux disease

== See also ==
- List of surgeries by type
