= Esophageal intramural pseudodiverticulosis =

- Other names: EIPD
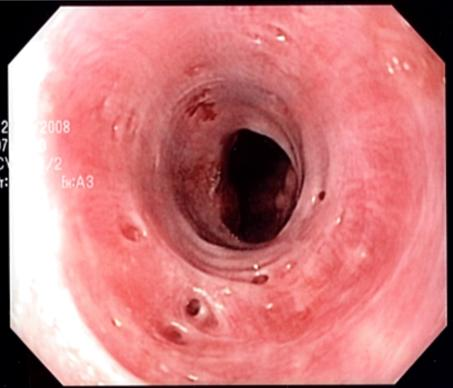
- Endoscopic image of esophageal intramural pseudodiverticulosis demonstrating the flask-like outpouchings of the esophageal wall.
- Specialty: Gastroenterology
- Symptoms: Difficulty swallowing
- Complications: Peridiverticulitis, esophageal cancer
- Diagnostic method: Upper endoscopy, barium esophagram
- Treatment: Esophageal dilation
- Medication: Proton-pump inhibitors

Esophageal intramucosal pseudodiverticulosis (EIPD) is a rare condition wherein the esophagus wall develops numerous small outpouchings (pseudodiverticulae). Individuals with the condition typically develop difficulty swallowing. The outpouchings represent the ducts of the submucosal glands of the esophagus. It typically affects individuals in their sixth and seventh decades of life. While it is associated with certain chronic conditions, particularly alcoholism, diabetes and gastroesophageal reflux disease, the cause of the condition is unknown. Treatment involves medications to treat concomitant conditions such as reflux (such as proton pump inhibitors) esophageal spasm, and dilation of strictures in the esophagus.

== Signs and symptoms ==
As the condition involves alterations in the wall of the esophagus and reduction in the calibre of the esophagus, the symptoms of esophageal intramucosal pseudodiverticulosis are primarily related to swallowing. Difficulty swallowing solids and pain while swallowing (odynophagia) are common symptoms. In extreme cases, food may become impacted in the esophagus. Some individuals may have bleeding in the esophagus, manifesting as vomiting of blood or as melena stools. With the reduction of oral intake due to difficulty swallowing, affected individuals usually lose weight.

== Cause ==
The cause of esophageal intramucosal pseudodiverticulosis is uncertain. It has been hypothesized that the pseudodiverticulae are not a primary phenomenon, but rather are secondary to a chronic irritant to the esophagus, or accentuation in the movement of the esophagus (hypermotility). Both of these factors lead to obstruction or compression of the submucosal ducts of the esophagus, leading to the formation of the pseudodiverticulae. Autopsy specimens of individuals with esophageal intramucosal pseudodiverticulosis have confirmed that the flask-like openings are indeed dilated submucosal glands. The condition is associated with alcohol use disorder, diabetes mellitus, and gastroesophageal reflux disease.

== Diagnosis ==
Esophageal intramucosal pseudodiverticulosis is typically diagnosed at the time of endoscopy of the esophagus. Endoscopy shows evidence of the pseudodiverticulae, which are typically numerous, appear like pits in the wall, and may be preferentially located in the upper esophagus. The mucosal lining of the esophagus may be inflamed, and this can be seen on endoscopy or biopsy; the mucosa, however, may also be normal if esophagitis is not the cause of the pseudodiverticulosis. The condition must also be excluded from esophageal cancer, which may be done at the time of endoscopy, or which may require esophageal biopsy.

Pseudodiverticulae may also be seen on barium swallow imaging of the esophagus. The appearance is of flask-shaped pseudodiverticulae, which may be present in the entire esophagus diffusely, or may be segmental. The pseudodiverticulae may be seen preferentially in the lower esophagus on barium swallow also. Strictures or narrowings in the esophagus may also be seen, typically in the upper esophagus.

As esophageal intramucosal pseudodiverticulosis is also associated with motility disturbances of the esophagus, manometry testing of esophageal pressures may provide information to assist in the diagnosis. Irregularity in the contractions of the esophagus, prominent tertiary contractions of the esophagus, or lack of esophageal contraction (aperistalsis) have all been reported on manometric testing of the esophagus.

== Management ==
Several treatment regimens have been described for esophageal intramucosal pseudodiverticulosis. Because the condition is associated with gastroesophageal reflux disease, proton pump inhibitors as anti-acid medications are used to treat the condition. If the condition is associated with spasm of the esophagus, antispasmodic medications such as butylscopolamine can be used. Dilation of areas of stricturing using esophageal bougies may provide relief of swallowing symptoms. The pseudodiverticulae themselves rarely cause symptoms, and treatment is not directed toward them.

== Prognosis ==
Periodic surveillance of the esophagus with endoscopy has been recommended due to a reported association of the condition with esophageal cancer. Rarely a condition called peridiverticulitis, associated with inflammation around the pseudodiverticulae has been reported over time leading to chest pain or pain while swallowing.

== Epidemiology ==
Approximately 250 cases of esophageal intramucosal pseudodiverticulosis have been reported. One study of over 14000 barium swallow x-rays identified the condition in 0.15% of individuals who had the procedure. While the disease has been reported as occurring at any time during life, it most frequently affects individuals in their 50s and 60s.
