= Jay Pasricha =

Indian physician and researcher

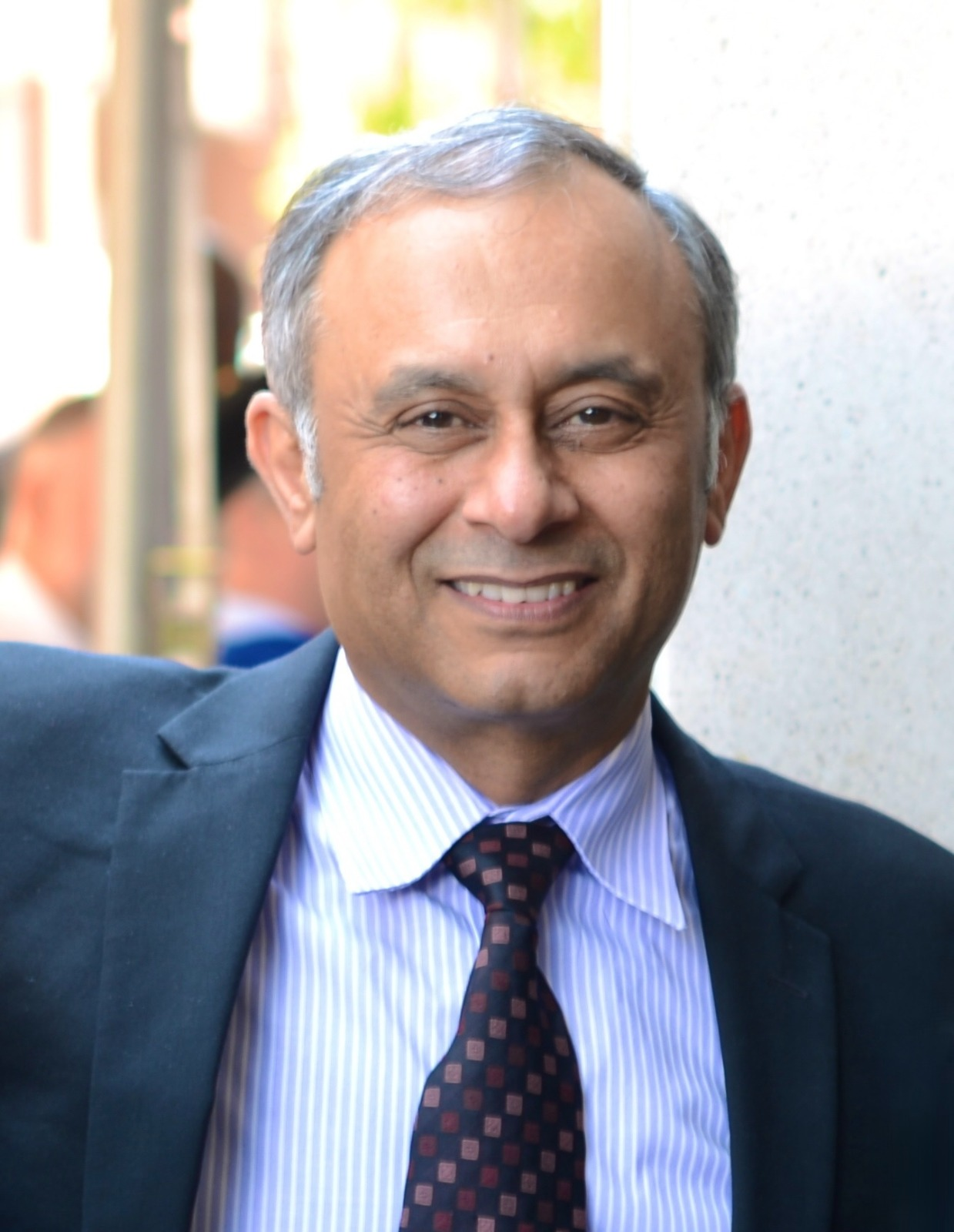
- Education: All-India Institute of Medical Sciences
- Known for: Leadership in gastroenterology, endoscopic procedures and devices, and GI motility disorders research
- Spouse: Reena Pasricha
- Children: 3
- Awards: American Gastroenterological Association Master’s Award for Outstanding Sustained Achievement in Gastroenterology, Nobility in Science Award from the National Pancreas Foundation
- Scientific career
- Fields: Medicine, Gastroenterology, Neurogastroenterology
- Workplaces: Mayo Clinic, Johns Hopkins University, University of Texas Medical Branch

Pankaj "Jay" Pasricha is a physician and researcher specializing in gastroenterology and neurogastroenterology. He currently serves as the chair of medicine at the Mayo Clinic in Scottsdale, Arizona. Formerly, he served as the director of the Johns Hopkins Center for Neurogastroenterology and was the founder and co-director of the Amos Food, Body and Mind Center, Vice Chair of Medicine for Innovation and Commercialization in the Johns Hopkins School of Medicine, and Professor of Innovation Management at the Carey Business School.

== Education ==
Pasricha received his M.B.B.S. degree from the All-India Institute of Medical Sciences, New Delhi in 1982. He trained in internal medicine and pulmonology at Georgetown University-DC General Hospital and Tufts University-New England Medical Center. He further trained in gastroenterology at Johns Hopkins Hospital.

== Career ==
After completing his fellowship in gastroenterology, Pasricha was appointed chair of the University of Texas Medical Branch in 1997, where he held the Bassel and Frances Blanton Distinguished Professorship in Internal Medicine. In 2007, Pasricha moved to Stanford University School of Medicine where he served as Professor of Medicine and Surgery until 2012. He then returned to Johns Hopkins School of Medicine as Vice Chair of Medicine for innovation and commercialization and Director of the Johns Hopkins Center for Neurogastroenterology. In 2022, Pasricha moved to Mayo Clinic Arizona as Chair of the Department of Medicine.

His research work spans endoscopic, clinical and bench research. He has been a recipient of federal funding for his research since 1995 and is principal investigator on multiple NIH grants, and other awards. His clinical and research interests include GI motility disorders and abdominal pain, and the development of novel endoscopic procedures and devices.

Among his notable contributions to gastroenterology are the introduction of botulinum toxin as a therapeutic agent for gastrointestinal disorders, including achalasia and sphincter of Oddi dysfunction. He also introduced cryotherapy as a treatment modality for gastrointestinal disease. Pasricha also developed the animal model for per-oral endoscopic myotomy (POEM), a third-space endoscopic treatment for achalasia in the mid-2000s while at University of Texas Medical Branch. It was taken to fruition by Professor Haruhiro Inoue, a thoracic surgeon at Showa University Koto Toyosu Hospital in Tokyo, who further developed POEM in humans.

On the bench research side, he pioneered the use of neural stem cell transplantation for disorders of gastrointestinal motility. Notably, he demonstrated that the enteric nervous system is in a state of continual turnover, identifying the stem cell responsible for that in mice studies. Pasricha also introduced the term "JAG-A" to encapsulate an emerging pattern of diseases demonstrating joint hyper-mobility, autonomic dysfunction gastrointestinal dysfunction, and autoimmunity.

Pasricha is the chair of the National Institutes of Health–funded multi-center Gastroparesis Clinical Research Consortium. He served on the National Commission on Digestive Diseases, appointed by the United States Congress to provide a roadmap for progress in gastrointestinal disorders. He is also the founding chair of the Center for Gastrointestinal Innovation and Technology, and has served on the Food and Drug Administration (FDA) GI Drug Advisory Committee.

Pasricha has help found a number of companies in the medical and gastroenterology spaces, including Apollo Endosurgery, an endoscopic devices company co-developed with Peter B. Cotton, that forms part of Boston Scientific.

== Publications and patents ==
Pasricha has authored more than 300 manuscripts and book chapters, and holds more than 50 patents for novel gastrointestinal diagnosis and treatment methods. His contributions include chapters in the Cecil Textbook of Medicine, Yamada Textbook of Gastroenterology, and Goodman & Gilman's The Pharmacological Basis of Therapeutics.

In terms of editorial roles, Pasricha has served as a senior editorial advisor for Digestive Diseases and Sciences, and as an associate editor for Gastroenterology, Journal of Pediatric Gastroenterology and Nutrition, and Gastrointestinal Endoscopy.

== Awards and recognition ==
Pasricha has received the American Gastroenterological Association Master's Award for Outstanding Sustained Achievement in Gastroenterology and the Nobility in Science Award from the National Pancreas Foundation.

== Personal life ==
Pasricha has been married for nearly 30 years, and he has three children with his wife.
