= Black hairy tongue =

Human disease

- Other names: Lingua villosa nigra or Melanoglossia.
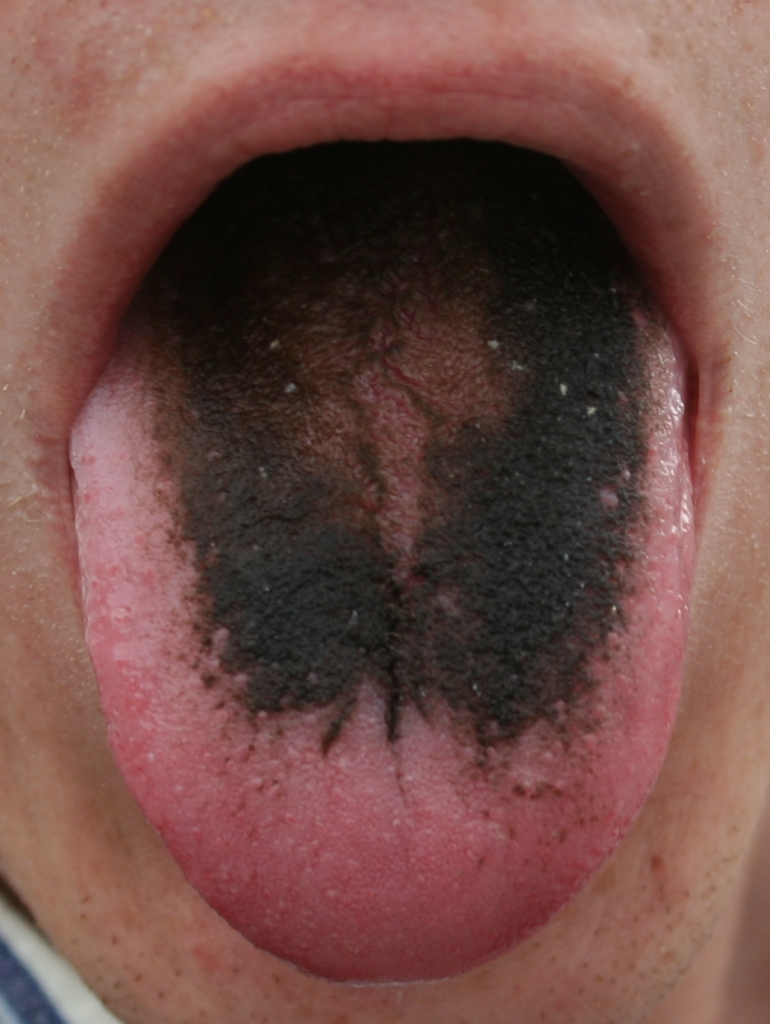
- A patient displaying characteristic dark bumps of black hairy tongue
- Specialty: Dermatology
- Risk factors: Smoking, poor oral hygiene, soft diet
- Diagnostic method: Based on clinical appearance
- Differential diagnosis: Hairy leukoplakia
- Treatment: Reassurance

Black hairy tongue syndrome (BHT) is a condition of the tongue in which the small bumps on the tongue elongate with black or brown discoloration, giving a black and hairy appearance. The appearance may be alarming, but it is a harmless condition. Predisposing factors include smoking, xerostomia (dry mouth), soft diet, poor oral hygiene and certain medications. Management is facilitated by improving oral hygiene, especially scraping or brushing the tongue.

== Signs and symptoms ==
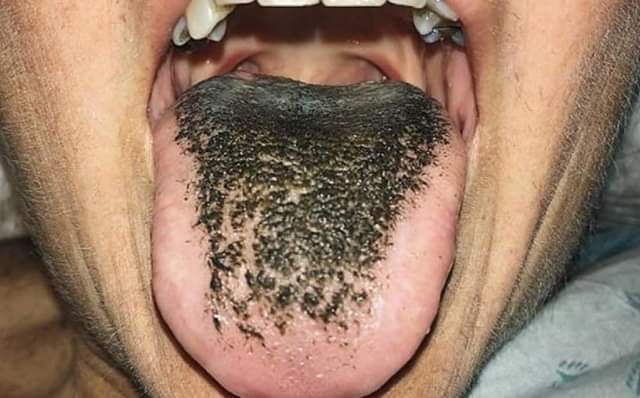
A patient with black hairy tongue.

Hairy tongue largely occurs in the central part of the dorsal tongue, just anterior (in front) of the circumvallate papillae, although sometimes the entire dorsal surface may be involved. Discoloration usually accompanies hairy tongue, and may be yellow, brown or black. Apart from the appearance, the condition is typically asymptomatic, but sometimes people may experience a gagging sensation or a bad taste. There may also be associated oral malodor (intra-oral halitosis).

The term "melanoglossia' is also used to refer to there being black discolorations on the tongue without "hairs", which are also harmless and unrelated to black hairy tongue.

== Causes ==
The cause is uncertain, but it is thought to be caused by accumulation of epithelial squames and proliferation of chromogenic (i.e., color-producing) microorganisms. There may be an increase in keratin production or a decrease in normal desquamation (shedding of surface epithelial cells). Many people with BHT are heavy smokers. Other possible associated factors are poor oral hygiene, general debilitation, hyposalivation (i.e., decreased salivary flow rate), radiotherapy, overgrowth of fungal or bacterial organisms, and a soft diet. Occasionally, BHT may be caused by the use of antimicrobial medications (e.g., tetracyclines), or oxidizing mouthwashes or antacids. A soft diet may be involved as normally food has an abrasive action on the tongue, which keeps the filiform papillae short. Pellagra, a condition caused by niacin (vitamin B3) deficiency, may cause a thick greyish fur to develop on the dorsal tongue, along with other oral signs.

Transient surface discoloration of the tongue and other soft tissues in the mouth can occur in the absence of hairy tongue. Causes include smoking (or betel chewing), some foods and beverages (e.g., coffee, tea or liquorice), and certain medications (e.g., chlorhexidine, iron salts, or bismuth subsalicylate (Pepto-Bismol)).

== Diagnosis ==
Diagnosis is usually made on the clinical appearance without the need for a tissue biopsy. However, when biopsies have been taken, the histologic appearance is one of marked elongation and hyperparakeratosis of the filiform papillae and numerous bacteria growing on the epithelial surface.

Hairy tongue may be confused with hairy leukoplakia, however the latter usually occurs on the sides of the tongue and is associated with an opportunistic infection with Epstein–Barr virus on a background immunocompromise (almost always human immunodeficiency virus (HIV) infection but rarely other conditions which suppress the immune system).

=== Classification ===
Hairy tongue (lingua villosa) refers to a marked accumulation of keratin on the filiform papillae on the dorsal surface of the tongue, giving a hair-like appearance. Black tongue (lingua nigra) refers to a black discoloration of the tongue, which may or may not be associated with hairy tongue. However, the elongated papillae of hairy tongue usually develop discoloration due to growth of pigment producing bacteria and staining from food. Hence the term black hairy tongue, although hairy tongue may also be discolored yellow or brown. Transient, surface discoloration that is not associated with hairy tongue can be brushed off. Drug-induced black hairy tongue specifically refers to BHT that develops because of medication. Black hairy tongue can also be caused by antibiotics e.g., (penicillins, cephalosporins, tetracyclines, clarithromycin and linezolid).

== Treatment ==
Treatment is by reassurance, as the condition is benign, and then by correction of any predisposing factors. This may be cessation of smoking or cessation/substitution of implicated medications or mouthwashes. Generally direct measures to return the tongue to its normal appearance involve improving oral hygiene, especially scraping or brushing the tongue before sleep. This promotes desquamation of the hyperparakeratotic papillae. Keratolytic agents (chemicals to remove keratin) such as podophyllin are successful, but carry safety concerns. Other reported successful measures include sodium bicarbonate mouthrinses, eating pineapple, sucking on a peach stone and chewing gum.

== Prognosis ==
BHT is a benign condition, but people who are affected may be distressed at the appearance and possible halitosis, and therefore treatment is indicated.

== Epidemiology ==
Hairy tongue occurs in about 0.5% of adults. However, the prevalence is variable depending on the population studied.
