= Per-oral endoscopic myotomy =

- Other names: POEM
- Specialty: Gastroenterology

The per-oral endoscopic myotomy, or POEM, is a minimally invasive surgical procedure for the treatment of achalasia wherein the inner circular muscle layer of the lower esophageal sphincter is divided through a submucosal tunnel. This enables food and liquids to pass into the stomach, a process that is impaired in achalasia. The tunnel is created, and the myotomy performed, using a flexible endoscope, meaning the entire procedure can be done without external incisions.

== History and development ==
Achalasia, a disease characterized by impaired esophageal peristalsis and failure of the lower esophageal sphincter to relax, has classically been treated endoscopically by dilation or botulinum toxin injection of the sphincter or surgically by a myotomy in which the muscle fibers are cut through a thoracic or abdominal approach. The principles of an endoscopic surgical myotomy were developed in the 2000s on animal models by Pankaj "Jay" Pasricha at University of Texas Medical Branch. The first endoscopic myotomy was performed on human patients by Haruhiro Inoue in Tokyo in 2008 who then coined the acronym POEM. It has since become increasingly popular internationally as a first-line therapy in patients with achalasia.

An advanced variation of per-oral endoscopic myotomy procedure has been developed Ahmed Madkour by targeting the EGJ triad and initial intramuscular dissection (IIMD).

== Procedure ==
POEM is a form of natural orifice translumenal endoscopic surgery, or NOTES. Like the traditional surgical myotomy, the procedure is performed under general endotracheal anesthesia. The remainder of the procedure is performed using a flexible endoscope inserted through the mouth, and no cuts are made on the chest or abdomen. Occasionally, an “overtube” is inserted to facilitate repeated removal & insertion of the endoscope. First, a submucosal injection of dyed saline creates a cushion, then a cut is made in the esophageal mucosa using electrocautery roughly 13 centimeters proximal to the lower esophageal sphincter. Then, using hydrostatic dissection and electrocautery, the submucosal tunnel is made. Once the circular fibers of the lower esophageal sphincter are encountered, they are divided using electrocautery all the way down onto the first part of the stomach. This functionally weakens the sphincter, allowing improved passage of food and liquid into the stomach. Finally, the submucosal flap is closed using clips or sutures also placed through the endoscope.

The procedure takes roughly 2 hours but can vary on physician and patient characteristics. Patients usually spend 1–3 days in the hospital before going home, and usually undergo a swallow study prior to resuming oral feeding. Patients may return to work and full activity immediately upon discharge from the hospital. Long-term patient satisfaction is similar following POEM compared to standard laparoscopic Heller myotomy.

== Risks and complications ==
Major complications are rare after POEM and include esophageal perforation and bleeding. Escape of air introduced through the endoscope into the surrounding tissues is a common occurrence and rarely requires additional intervention.

The major long term risk after POEM is new or worsened gastroesophageal reflux disease, which arises in 20-46% of patients. This phenomenon is usually mild and manageable with medication alone, and does not occur at a significantly higher rate than in patients undergoing a traditional surgical therapy. Incomplete myotomy resulting in a persistence of symptoms is also described and requires repeating the procedure.

== Cost ==
As of March, 2017, POEM is classified as an experimental therapy in the United States and is not reimbursed by insurance providers. Recent investigations have demonstrated both equivalency and superiority of POEM compared to laparoscopic Heller myotomy.

== Future directions ==
POEM has been established as a safe and efficacious treatment for achalasia and is becoming increasingly popular as a first line alternative to conventional laparoscopic myotomy. A randomized, controlled trials comparing the two procedures will be published soon as the abstract had been presented during UEGW 2018. This procedure also requires extensive training in advanced endoscopy and a knowledge of the surgical anatomy of the alimentary tract. Currently, many international conferences and post-graduate fellowships in both surgery and gastroenterology specialize in training physicians to perform POEM.
