= Haruhiro Inoue =

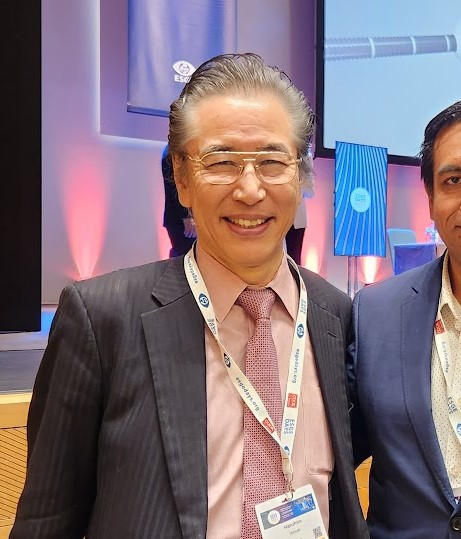
- Education: Yamaguchi University, School of Medicine
- Occupations: Surgeon, endoscopist
- Known for: cap-EMR technique, Per-oral Endoscopic Myotomy (POEM)
- Awards: Crystal Award, American Society for Gastrointestinal Endoscopy (2006, 2013), George Berci Lifetime Achievement Award, SAGES (2022)

Haruhiro Inoue is a Japanese thoracic surgeon and endoscopist best known for the development of the cap endoscopic mucosal resection technique, and the first per-oral endoscopic myotomy performed in humans. He is a professor at Showa University and Director of the Digestive Disease Centre at Showa University Koto-Toyosu Hospital in Tokyo. He is known for his work in endoscopy and his contribution to the development of endoscopic technologies and procedures.

== Education and career ==
Inoue received an M.D. from Yamaguchi University School of Medicine in 1983. In 1999, he was awarded a Ph.D. from Tokyo Medical and Dental University. In 2009, he was promoted to full professor at Showa University, where he also served as the chief professor at the Showa University International Training Center for Endoscopic Surgery (SUITES). In 2014, he moved to his current position as Professor and Director of the Digestive Disease Center at Showa University Koto-Toyosu Hospital. From 2020 to 2022, he served as President of the Japanese Society of Gastrointestinal Endoscopy (JGES), and currently serves as an advisor to the JGES.

== Achievements and awards ==
Inoue has made several significant contributions to the field of endoscopy. In 1992, he developed a technique (cap-EMR) that simplified the performance of endoscopic mucosal resection (EMR), and in 2000, he reported the world’s first EMR for Barrett’s esophagus intramucosal cancer. In 2003, he reported the world's first "circumferential" EMR for Barrett's esophagus with high-grade dysplasia, where the esophagus was stripped of its pre-cancerous mucosa around a 360 degrees. In 2008, he performed the world's first clinical case of per-oral endoscopic myotomy (POEM), a treatment for achalasia, building upon the pig model work of Jay Pasricha. In 2014, he reported the first endoscopic resection of submucosal tumors using a POEM-like procedure, known as per-oral endoscopic tumor resection (POET). In 2019, he reported the development of a novel technique, POEM+F (POEM+fundoplication) as a therapy for gastro-esophageal reflux disease which commonly complicates POEM therapy for achalasia.

Inoue is a Fellow of the American Society for Gastrointestinal Endoscopy, and he was honored twice with the society’s Crystal award (2006 and 2013). In 2011, he received the Pioneer in Endoscopy Award from the Society of American Gastrointestinal and Endoscopic Surgeons (SAGES), and in 2022, he was honored with that organization's George Berci Lifetime Achievement Award, its highest honour.
