= John S. Greenspan =

Anglo-American academic dentist/scientist (1938–2023)

- Born: January 7, 1938; London, England
- Died: March 31, 2023 (aged 85); Marin County, California, U.S.
- Medical career
- Profession: Academic/Dentist Scientist and Administrator
- Field: Dentistry, Pathology, HIV/AIDS
- Institutions: University of California, San Francisco (UCSF)
- Research: HIV/AIDS

John S. Greenspan (January 7, 1938 – March 31, 2023) was an academic dentist/scientist and university administrator. His degrees and diplomas include BSc, BDS, Ph.D., FRCPath, FDSRCS (Eng). He was the Director-Emeritus of the AIDS Research Institute at the University of California, San Francisco (UCSF). He was also the founding Director of the UCSF AIDS Specimen Bank (1982-2017) and of the UCSF Oral AIDS Center (1986–2005).

== Early life and education ==
Greenspan was a Distinguished Professor-Emeritus of Oral Pathology in the Department of Orofacial Sciences and he was also the former Associate Dean for Global Oral Health and for Research and Graduate Education in the School of Dentistry as well as of Pathology in the School of Medicine at UCSF. He was a Fellow of King's College, London. He was a faculty member at UCSF since 1976. His early education was at the Royal Liberty School, Romford, Essex and at Hendon County School, Hendon, Middlesex, England. His university education was at the Royal Dental Hospital School of Dental Surgery (BDS), Royal School Free Hospital School of Medicine where he earned a BSc First in Anatomy, the Royal Postgraduate Medical School with AGE Pearse (PhD) and St George's Hospital School of Medicine (M then FRCPath), all schools of the University of London.

== Work ==
In 1996-97 he was the Burroughs-Wellcome Professor of the UK Royal Society of Medicine and in 2010 the Distinguished Scientist Award recipient of the American Association for Dental Research (AADR). He was a Member of the US National Academy of Medicine and in 1990 he was awarded the honorary degree of ScD by Georgetown University. In 2012, he was awarded the triennial American Dental Association Gold Medal Award for Excellence in Dental Research. He was also a Past-President of the American Association for Dental Research 1988-1989 and of the International Association for Dental Research 1996–1997. He was also the founding President of the International Association for Dental Research Global Oral Health Inequalities Research Network (IADR-GOHIRN) and of the Consortium of Universities for Global Health's Global Oral Health Interest Group (GOHIG).

He was for 20 years a Division, then department chair at UCSF, where he was a prime mover in building the science of that School, leading to it being the leader in USA dental schools’ extramural funding for 25 years. He was Chair of the Faculty of the School of Dentistry, Chair of the San Francisco Division of the UC Academic Senate and served on and chaired many Senate and campus, also Systemwide committees. He and his spouse and colleague Deborah Greenspan were jointly the recipients of the UCSF Faculty Senate Campuswide Research Lecture Award in Translational Science in 2014, the first time in the history of UCSF that this honor was bestowed on School of Dentistry faculty members. He was previously Senior Lecturer/Consultant at the Royal Dental Hospital School of Dental Surgery as well as Consultant at St George's Hospital and St John's Hospital for Skin Diseases in London, conducting the Royal's Oral Pathology service and also responsible for the oral medicine clinic. He supervised and/or mentored over 120 physician/scientists, dentist/scientists and PhD scientists in aspects of oral pathology and medicine, AIDS/HIV, global oral health and related topics. Greenspan was President of the Emeriti Faculty Association of UCSF and Chair of the School of Dentistry Dean's Advisory Committee.

Greenspan's oral disease research interests centered on the epidemiology, etiopathogenesis and management of oral soft tissue diseases, notably those associated with HIV infection and other causes of immunosuppression, as well as aphthous ulcers, Sjögren syndrome, and oral cancer/pre-cancer. These topics have led to broad explorations in epidemiology, public/global health, policy, implementation science and other areas. He served until 2005 as founding Director of the UCSF Oral AIDS Center (OAC), which was supported by the NIDCR for 20 years. The OAC continues its research on the pathogenesis of oral lesions associated with HIV infection. He was part of a team looking into the molecular pathogenesis of Epstein–Barr virus-associated hairy leukoplakia. Hairy leukoplakia is a lesion that Deborah Greenspan and he discovered, and in 1985 they identified a connection between it and Epstein–Barr virus (EBV).

He was the founding co-Principal Investigator of the National Institute for Dental and Craniofacial Research-funded International Research Registry Network for Sjögren syndrome (SICCA) and continued to participate in the project throughout his life. He was the recipient of over $70 million in total costs of research grants and contract funding from Federal, State and industry agencies in 42 years at UCSF. He was among the top 5% of NIH awardees by total funding in the 25 years through 2007. He published over 300 papers and four books on oral aspects of AIDS, oral pathology, and immunopathology. He was a featured speaker at many international meetings and presented over 300 research papers, clinics, and postgraduate courses. He was an associate editor or board member of several journals and was a founding editor of Oral Diseases.
