= Hairy leukoplakia =

Benign lesion on the side of the tongue due to Epstein-Barr virus

- Other names: Oral hairy leukoplakia, OHL, or HIV-associated hairy leukoplakia
- Specialty: Gastroenterology, dentistry

Hairy leukoplakia is a white patch on the side of the tongue with a corrugated or hairy appearance. It is caused by Epstein-Barr virus (EBV) and occurs usually in persons who are immunocompromised, especially those with human immunodeficiency virus infection/acquired immunodeficiency syndrome (HIV/AIDS). The white lesion, which cannot be scraped off, is benign and does not require any treatment, although its appearance may have diagnostic and prognostic implications for the underlying condition.

Depending upon what definition of leukoplakia is used, hairy leukoplakia is sometimes considered a subtype of leukoplakia, or a distinct diagnosis.

== Signs and symptoms ==
There are no symptoms associated with the lesion itself, although many and varied symptoms and signs may be associated with the underlying cause of immunosuppression. The lesion is a white patch, which almost exclusively occurs on the lateral surfaces of the tongue, although rarely it may occur on the buccal mucosa, soft palate, pharynx or esophagus. The lesion may grow to involve the dorsal surface of the tongue. The texture is vertically corrugated ("hairy") or thickly furrowed and shaggy in appearance.

== Causes ==
The white appearance is created by hyperkeratosis (overproduction of keratin) and epithelial hyperplasia. The causative agent implicated is Epstein-Barr virus, the same virus that causes infectious mononucleosis (glandular fever). After the primary EBV infection has been overcome, the virus will persist for the rest of the host's life and "hides" from the immune system by latent infection of B lymphocytes. The virus also causes lytic infection in the oropharynx, but is kept in check by a normal, functioning immune system. Uncontrolled lytic infection is manifested as oral hairy leukoplakia in immunocompromised hosts. OHL usually arises where the immunocompromise is secondary to HIV/AIDS. Rarely are other causes of immunocompromise associated with OHL, but it has been reported in people who have received transplants and are taking immunosuppressive medication. OHL may also accompany chronic graft versus host disease. Even more rare are reports of OHL in persons with competent immune systems.

== Diagnosis ==
The white lesion cannot be wiped away, unlike some other common oral white lesions, e.g. pseudomembranous candidiasis, and this may aid in the diagnosis. Diagnosis of OHL is mainly clinical, but can be supported by proof of EBV in the lesion (achieved by in situ hybridization, polymerase chain reaction, immunohistochemistry, Southern blotting, or electron microscopy) and HIV serotesting. When clinical appearance alone is used to diagnose OHL, there is a false positive rate of 17% compared to more objective methods. The appearance of OHL in a person who is known to be infected with HIV does not usually require further diagnostic tests as the association is well known. OHL in persons with no known cause of immunocompromise usually triggers investigations to look for an underlying cause. If tissue biopsy is carried out, the histopathologic appearance is of hyperplastic and parakeratinized epithelium, with "balloon cells" (lightly staining cells) in the upper stratum spinosum and "nuclear beading" in the superficial layers (scattered cells with peripheral margination of chromatin and clear nuclei, created by displacement of chromatin to the peripheral nucleus by EBV replication). Candida usually is seen growing in the parakeratin layer, but there are no normal inflammatory reactions to this in the tissues. There is no dysplasia (OHL is not a premalignant lesion).

=== Classification ===
In a classification of the oral lesions in HIV disease, OHL is grouped as "lesions strongly associated with HIV infection" (group I). It could also be classed as an opportunistic, viral disease. Hairy leukoplakia occurs on the tongue and has a similar name to hairy tongue, but these are separate conditions with different causes.

== Treatment ==
Treatment is not necessary since the lesion is benign, however, the person may have aesthetic concerns about the appearance. The condition often resolves rapidly with high dose acyclovir or desiclovir but recurs once this therapy is stopped, or as the underlying immunocompromise worsens. Topical use of podophyllum resin or retinoids has also been reported to produce temporary remission.

Antiretroviral drugs such as zidovudine may be effective in producing a significant regression of OHL. Recurrence of the lesion may also signify that highly active antiretroviral therapy (HAART) is becoming ineffective.

== Prognosis ==
The oral lesion itself is benign and self-limiting, however this may not necessarily be the case for the underlying cause of immunocompromise. For instance, OHL with HIV/AIDS is a predictor of bad prognosis, (i.e. severe immunosuppression and advanced disease).

== Epidemiology ==
Hairy leukoplakia is one of the most common oral manifestations of HIV/AIDS, along with oral candidiasis. It is the most common HIV/AIDS related condition caused by EBV, although EBV associated lymphomas may also occur. OHL mainly occurs in adult males, less commonly in adult females and rarely in children. The incidence rises as the CD4 count falls, and the appearance of OHL may signify progression of HIV to AIDS. A study from 2001 reported a significant decrease in the incidence of some oral manifestations of AIDS (including OHL and necrotizing ulcerative periodontitis), which was attributed to the use of HAART, whilst the incidence of other HIV-associated oral lesions did not alter significantly.

== History ==
Oral hairy leukoplakia was discovered by Deborah Greenspan and John S. Greenspan, and in 1985 they identified a connection between it and Epstein-Barr virus (EBV). Oral hairy leukoplakia was first described by Greenspan et al. in 1984, a few years after the start of the AIDS epidemic. A link with OHL was not initially reported as scientific understanding of HIV/AIDS was just beginning to develop at that time. It was subsequently thought to occur only in HIV-infected, homosexual males, however, this is now known to not always be the case.

== Research directions ==
It has been suggested that OHL be renamed according to its causative factor as “EBV leucoplakia”.
