= Deborah Greenspan =

British-American scholar in dentistry & professor

Deborah Greenspan is a British-American scholar in dentistry, having been Professor and the Leland and Gladys Barber Distinguished Professor at UCSF Helen Diller Family Comprehensive Cancer Center, University of California, San Francisco.

She and her spouse and colleague John S. Greenspan were jointly the recipients of the UCSF Faculty Senate Campuswide Research Lecture Award in Translational Science in 2014, the first time in the history of UCSF that this honor was bestowed on School of Dentistry faculty members. She and John S. Greenspan also discovered hairy leukoplakia, which is a lesion, and in 1985 they identified a connection between it and Epstein–Barr virus (EBV).
