= Liquid diet =

Diet that mostly consists of liquids

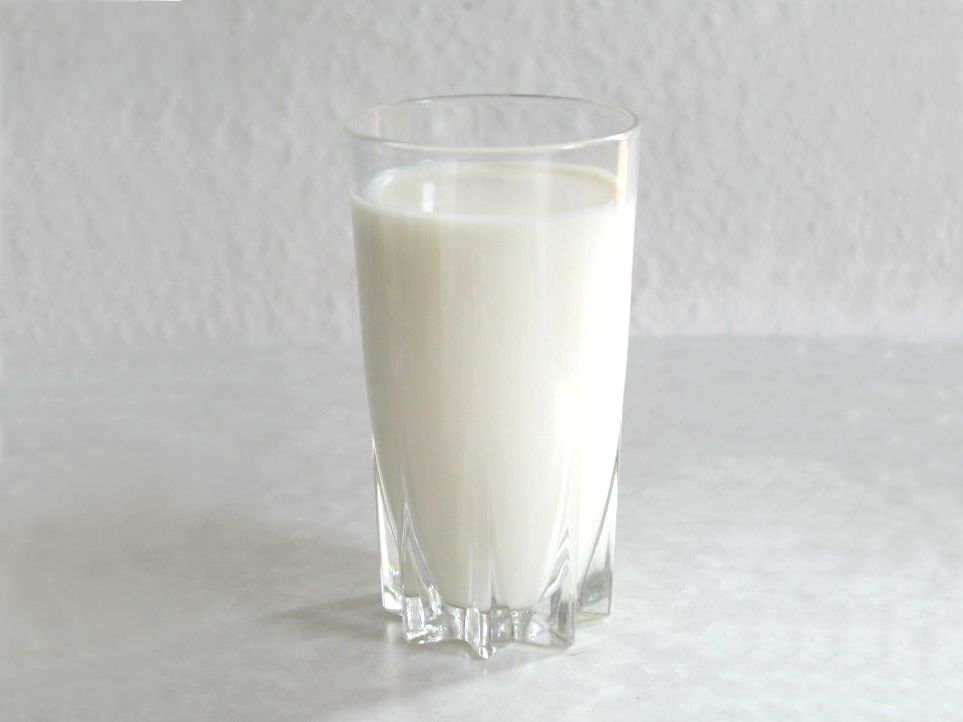
Milk is permitted on a full-liquid diet, but not a clear-liquid diet.

A liquid diet is a diet that mostly consists of liquids, or soft foods that melt at room temperature (such as ice cream). A liquid diet usually helps provide sufficient hydration, helps maintain electrolyte balance, and is often prescribed for people when solid food diets are not recommended, such as for people who suffer with gastrointestinal illness or damage, or before or after certain types of medical tests or surgeries involving the mouth or the digestive tract.

A liquid diet is not recommended outside of hospital or medical supervision. Negative side effects include fatigue, nausea, dizziness, hair loss and dry skin which are said to disappear when the person resumes eating.

== Causes ==
The most common reason for going on a liquid diet is gastrointestinal problems. The human stomach can, on average, hold 1 to 1.5 liters of food. As solid foods must be converted into small water-soluble compounds to enter the blood plasma, the overall surface area for digestion of solid food is small. Liquid foods, by contrast, almost entire surface area can be digested, and have a higher bioavailability than solid food. This can lessen negative effects from digestion, like bloating, nausea and stomach ache.

== Clear liquid diet ==
A clear liquid diet, sometimes called a surgical liquid diet because of its perioperative uses, consists of a diet containing exclusively transparent beverages that do not contain any solid particulates. This includes vegetable broth, bouillon (excepting any particulate dregs), clear fruit juices such as filtered apple juice or white grape juice, clear fruit ices or ice pops, clear gelatin desserts, and certain carbonated drinks such as ginger ale and seltzer water. It excludes all drinks containing milk, but may accept tea or coffee. Typically, this diet contains about 500 calories per day, which is too little food energy for long-term use.

== Full liquid diet ==
A full or strained liquid diet consists of both clear and opaque liquid foods with a smooth consistency. People who follow this diet may also take liquid vitamin supplements. Some individuals who are told to follow a full-liquid diet are additionally permitted certain components of a mechanical soft diet, such as strained meats, sour cream, cottage cheese, ricotta, yogurt, mashed vegetables or fruits, etc.

== See also ==
- List of diets
