= Heller myotomy =

Surgical cutting of the lower esophageal sphincter muscles

- Specialty: Gastroenterology

Heller myotomy is a surgical procedure in which the muscles of the cardia (lower esophageal sphincter or LES) are cut, allowing food and liquids to pass to the stomach. It is used to treat achalasia, a disorder in which the lower esophageal sphincter fails to relax properly, making it difficult for food and liquids to reach the stomach.

== History and development ==
It was first performed by Ernst Heller (1877–1964) in 1913. Then and until recently, this surgery was performed using an open procedure, either through the chest (thoracotomy) or through the abdomen (laparotomy). However, open procedures involve greater recovery times. Modern Heller myotomy is normally performed using minimally invasive laparoscopic techniques, which minimize risks and speeds recovery significantly. The 100th anniversary of Heller's description of the surgical treatment of patients with achalasia was celebrated in 2014.

== Procedure ==
During the procedure, the patient is put under general anaesthesia. Five or six small incisions are made in the abdominal wall and laparoscopic instruments are inserted. The myotomy is a lengthwise cut along the esophagus, starting usually about 6 cm above the lower esophageal sphincter and extending down onto the stomach approximately 2-2.5 cm. The oesophagus is made of several layers, and the myotomy only cuts through the outside muscle layers which are squeezing it shut, leaving the inner mucosal layer intact. This procedure can also be performed robotically.

== Risks, complications, and outlook ==
There is a small risk of perforation during the myotomy. A gastrografin swallow is performed after the surgery to check for leaks. If the surgeon accidentally cuts through the innermost layer of the esophagus, the perforation may need to be closed with a stitch.

Food can easily pass downward after the myotomy has cut through the lower oesophageal sphincter, but stomach acids can also easily reflux upward. Therefore, this surgery is often combined with partial fundoplication to reduce the incidence of postoperative acid reflux. In Dor or anterior fundoplication, which is the most common method, part of the stomach (the fundus) is laid over the front of the oesophagus and stitched into place so that whenever the stomach contracts, it also closes off the oesophagus instead of squeezing stomach acids into it. In Toupet or posterior fundoplication, the fundus is passed around the back of the oesophagus instead. Nissen or complete fundoplication (wrapping the fundus all the way around the oesophagus) is generally not considered advisable because peristalsis is absent in achalasia patients.

This is a somewhat challenging operation, and surgeons have reported improved outcomes after their first 50 patients. An author search at Google Scholar can be used to find studies on a surgeon's past experience with achalasia patients.

After laparoscopic surgery, most patients can take clear liquids later the same day, start a soft diet within 2–3 days, and return to a normal diet after one month. The typical hospital stay is 2–3 days, and many patients can return to work after two weeks. If the surgery is done open instead of laparoscopically, patients may need to take a month off work. Heavy lifting is typically restricted for six weeks or more.

The Heller myotomy is a long-term treatment, and many patients do not require any further treatment. However, some will eventually need pneumatic dilation, repeat myotomy (usually performed as an open procedure the second time around), or oesophagectomy. It is important to monitor changes in the shape and function of the esophagus with an annual timed barium swallow. Regular endoscopy may also be useful to monitor changes in the tissue of the oesophagus, since reflux may damage the oesophagus over time, potentially causing the return of dysphagia, or a premalignant condition known as Barrett's esophagus.

Though this surgery does not correct the underlying cause and does not eliminate achalasia symptoms, the vast majority of patients find that the surgery greatly improves their ability to eat and drink. It is considered the definitive treatment for achalasia.

== See also ==
- List of surgeries by type
