= Esophagitis =

Inflammation of the esophagus

- Other names: Oesophagitis
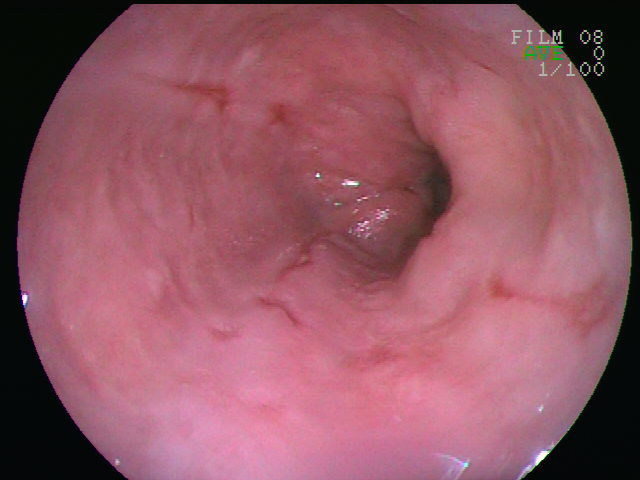
- An esophageal ulcer visualized by esophagoscopy: the reddened area at 10 o'clock on the surface of the mucosa.
- Specialty: Gastroenterology
- Complications: Cancer

Esophagitis, also spelled oesophagitis, is a disease characterized by inflammation of the esophagus. The esophagus is a tube composed of a mucosal lining, and longitudinal and circular smooth muscle fibers. It connects the pharynx to the stomach; swallowed food and liquids normally pass through it.

Esophagitis can be asymptomatic or can cause epigastric and/or substernal burning pain, especially when lying down or straining, and can make swallowing difficult (dysphagia). The most common cause of esophagitis is the reverse flow of acid from the stomach into the lower esophagus: gastroesophageal reflux disease (GERD).

== Signs and symptoms ==
The symptoms of esophagitis include:

- Heartburn – a burning sensation in the lower mid-chest
- Nausea
- Dysphagia – swallowing is painful, with difficulty passing or inability to pass food through the esophagus
- Vomiting (emesis)
- Abdominal pain
- Cough

While these are common symptoms in adults, symptoms in children may include poor appetite, swallowing difficulties, or stomach ache.

=== Complications ===
If the disease remains untreated, it can cause scarring and discomfort in the esophagus. If the irritation is not allowed to heal, esophagitis can result in esophageal ulcers. Esophagitis can develop into Barrett's esophagus and can increase the risk of esophageal cancer.

== Causes ==
Infectious esophagitis cannot be spread. However, infections can be spread by those who have infectious esophagitis. Esophagitis can develop due to many causes. GERD is the most common cause of esophagitis because of the backflow of acid from the stomach, which can irritate the lining of the esophagus.

Other causes include:

- Medicines – Can cause esophageal damage that can lead to esophageal ulcers
  - Nonsteroidal anti-inflammatory drugs (NSAIDS) – aspirin, naproxen sodium, and ibuprofen. Known to irritate the GI tract.
  - Antibiotics – doxycycline and tetracycline
  - Quinidine
  - Bisphosphonates – used to treat osteoporosis
  - Steroids
  - Potassium chloride
  - Vitamins and supplements (iron, vitamin C, and potassium) – Supplements and minerals can be hard on the GI tract.
- Chemical injury by alkaline or acidic solutions
- Physical injury resulting from nasogastric tubes.
- Alcohol use disorder – Can wear down the lining of the esophagus.
- Crohn's disease – a type of IBD that can cause esophagitis if it attacks the esophagus.
- Stress – Can cause higher levels of acid reflux
- Radiation therapy – Can affect the immune system.
- Allergies (food, inhalants) – Allergies can stimulate eosinophilic esophagitis.
- Infection – People with immunodeficiencies have a higher chance of developing esophagitis.
- Vomiting – Acid can irritate the esophagus.
- Hernias – A hernia can poke through the diaphragm muscle and can inhibit stomach acid and food from draining quickly.
- Surgery
- Eosinophilic esophagitis, a more chronic condition with a theorized autoimmune component

== Mechanism ==
The esophagus is a muscular tube containing both voluntary and involuntary muscles. It is responsible for peristalsis of food. It is about 8 inches long and passes through the diaphragm before entering the stomach. The esophagus is made up of three layers: from the inside out, they are the mucosa, submucosa, muscularis externa. The mucosa, the innermost layer and lining of the esophagus, is composed of stratified squamous epithelium, lamina propria, and muscularis mucosae. At the end of the esophagus is the lower esophageal sphincter, which normally prevents stomach acid from entering the esophagus.

If the sphincter is not sufficiently tight, it may allow acid to enter the esophagus, causing inflammation of one or more layers. Esophagitis may also occur if an infection is present, which may be due to bacteria, viruses, or fungi; or by diseases that affect the immune system.

GERD, vomiting, surgery, medications, hernias, and radiation injury can irritate the esophagus. Inflammation can cause the esophagus to narrow, which makes swallowing food difficult and may result in food bolus impaction.

== Diagnosis ==
Esophagitis can be diagnosed by upper endoscopy, biopsy, upper GI series (or barium swallow), and laboratory tests.

An upper endoscopy is a procedure to look at the esophagus by using an endoscope. While looking at the esophagus, the doctor can take a small biopsy. The biopsy can be used to confirm esophageal inflammation.

An upper GI series uses a barium contrast, fluoroscopy, and an X-ray. During a barium X-ray, a barium solution or pill is taken before getting an X-ray. The barium makes the organs more visible and can detect if there is any narrowing, inflammation, or other abnormalities that can be causing the disease. The upper GI series can be used to find the cause of GI symptoms. An esophagram is if only the throat and esophagus are looked at.

Laboratory tests can be done on biopsies removed from the esophagus and can help determine the cause of the esophagitis. Laboratory tests can help diagnose a fungal, viral, or bacterial infection. Scanning for white blood cells can help diagnose eosinophil esophagitis.

Some lifestyle indicators for this disease include stress, unhealthy eating, smoking, drinking, family history, allergies, and immunodeficiency.

=== Types ===
Reflux esophagitis

Gastroesophageal reflux disease is usually assumed to be caused by inflammation from gastric acid reflux which irritates the mucosa. One study suggests that the pathogenesis may be cytokine-mediated.

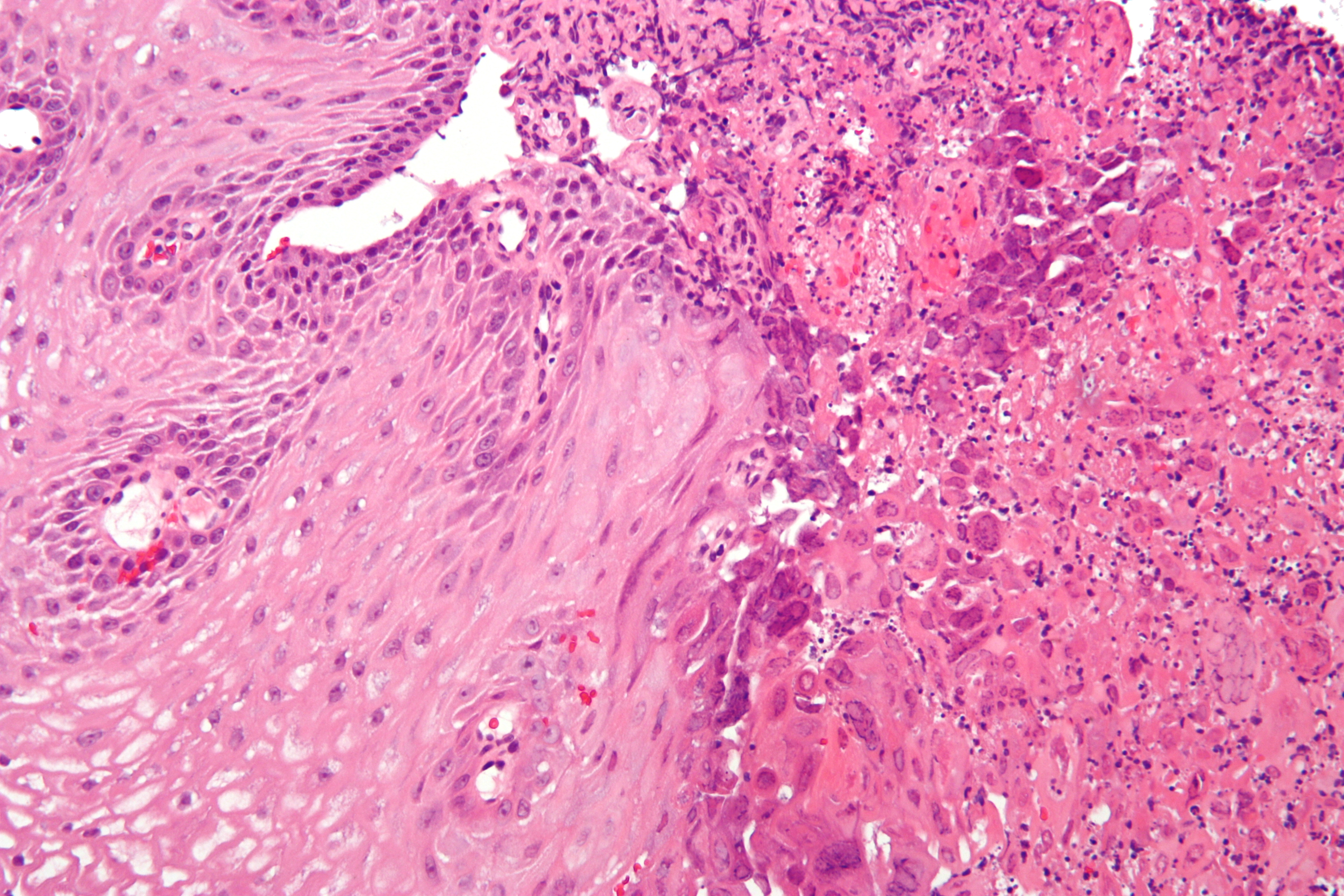
Microscopic Slide of Infectious Esophagitis

Infectious esophagitis

Esophagitis happens due to a viral, fungal, parasitic, or bacterial infection. More likely to happen to people who have an immunodeficiency. Types include:

Fungal

- Candida (Esophageal candidiasis)

Viral

- Herpes simplex (Herpes esophagitis)
- Cytomegalovirus

Drug-induced esophagitis

Damage to the esophagus due to medications. If the esophagus is not coated or if the medicine is not taken with enough liquid, it can damage the tissues.

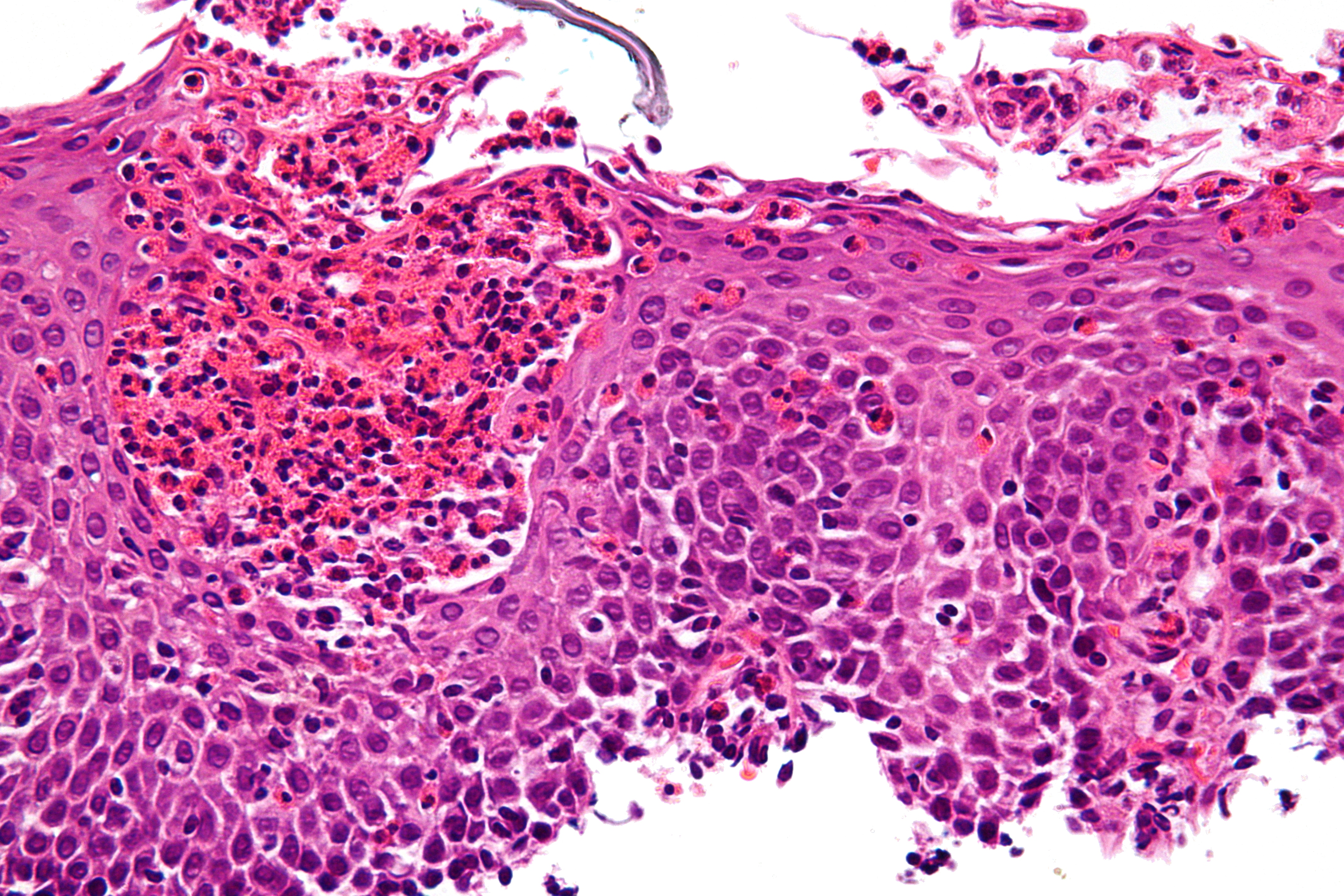
Microscopic Slide of Eosinophilic Esophagitis

Eosinophilic esophagitis

Eosinophilic esophagitis is caused by a high concentration of eosinophils in the esophagus. The presence of eosinophils in the esophagus may be due to an allergen and is often correlated with GERD. The direction of cause and effect between inflammation and acid reflux is poorly established, with recent studies (in 2016) hinting that reflux does not cause inflammation. This esophagitis can be triggered by allergies to food or to inhaled allergens. This type is still poorly understood.

Lymphocytic esophagitis

Lymphocytic esophagitis is a rare and poorly understood entity associated with an increased amount of lymphocytes in the lining of the esophagus. It was first described in 2006. Disease associations may include Crohn's disease, gastroesophageal reflux disease, and coeliac disease. It causes similar changes on endoscopy as eosinophilic esophagitis, including esophageal rings, narrow-lumen esophagus, and linear furrows.

Caustic esophagitis

Caustic esophagitis is tissue damage due to exposure to harsh, corrosive chemicals. This occasionally occurs through occupational exposure (via breathing of fumes that mix into the saliva, which is then swallowed) or through pica.

=== By severity ===
The severity of reflux esophagitis is commonly classified into four grades according to the Los Angeles Classification:

Grade A	One or more mucosal breaks < 5 mm in maximal length
Grade B	One or more mucosal breaks > 5mm, but without continuity across mucosal folds
Grade C	Mucosal breaks continuous between ≥ 2 mucosal folds but involving less than 75% of the esophageal circumference
Grade D	Mucosal breaks involving more than 75% of esophageal circumference

== Prevention ==
Since there can be many causes underlying esophagitis, it is important to try to find the cause to help to prevent esophagitis. To prevent reflux esophagitis, avoid acidic foods, caffeine, eating before going to bed, alcohol, fatty meals, and smoking. To prevent drug-induced esophagitis, drink plenty of liquids when taking medicines, take an alternative drug, and do not take medicines while lying down, before sleeping, or too many at one time. Esophagitis is more prevalent in adults and does not discriminate.

== Treatment ==
=== Lifestyle changes ===
Losing weight, stopping smoking and alcohol, lowering stress, avoiding sleeping/lying down after eating, raising the head of the bed, taking medicines correctly, avoiding certain medications, and avoiding foods that cause reflux that might be causing the esophagitis.

=== Medications ===
==== Antacids ====
To treat reflux esophagitis, over-the-counter antacids, medications that reduce acid production (H-2 receptor blockers), and proton pump inhibitors are recommended to help block acid production to allow the esophagus to heal. Some prescription medications to treat reflux esophagitis include higher-dose H-2 receptor blockers, proton pump inhibitors, and prokinetics, which help with the emptying of the stomach. However, prokinetics are no longer licensed for GERD because their evidence of efficacy is poor, and following a safety review, licensed use of domperidone and metoclopramide is now restricted to short-term use in nausea and vomiting only.

==== For subtypes ====
To treat eosinophilic esophagitis, avoiding allergens that may be stimulating the eosinophils is recommended. As for medications, proton pump inhibitors and steroids can be prescribed. Steroids that are used to treat asthma can be swallowed to treat eosinophil esophagitis due to non-food allergens. The removal of food allergens from the diet is included to help treat eosinophilic esophagitis.

For infectious esophagitis, medicine is prescribed based on the type of infection causing it. These medicines are prescribed to treat bacterial, fungal, viral, and/or parasitic infections.

=== Procedures ===
- An endoscopy can be used to remove ill fragments.
- Surgery can be done to remove the damaged part of the esophagus.
- For reflux esophagitis, a fundoplication can be done to help strengthen the lower esophageal sphincter from allowing backflow of the stomach into the esophagus.
- For esophageal stricture, a gastroenterologist can perform a dilation of the esophagus.

As of 2020, evidence for magnetic sphincter augmentation is poor.

== Prognosis ==
The prognosis for a person with esophagitis depends on the underlying causes and conditions. If a patient has a more serious underlying cause, such as a digestive system or immune system issue, it may be more difficult to treat. Normally, the prognosis would be good with no serious illnesses. If there is more than one cause, the prognosis could move to fair.

== Terminology ==
The term is from Greek οἰσοφάγος "esophag-" [-us] + suffix "-itis" "esophagus inflammation"
