= Soft diet =

Type of diet

A mechanical soft diet or edentulous diet, or soft food(s) diet, is a diet that involves only foods that are physically soft, with the goal of reducing or eliminating the need to chew the food. This is also commonly referred to as a texture-modified diet within the speech-language pathology field and can have varying degrees of severity ranging from mushy solids to thicker liquids to a pure liquid diet. The IDDSI (International Dysphagia Diet Standardization Initiative) has developed a standardized framework for labeling the modified foods and liquids. It is recommended for people who have difficulty chewing food, including people with some types of dysphagia (difficulty swallowing), the loss of many or all teeth, pain from recently adjusted dental braces, or surgery involving the jaw, mouth, or gastrointestinal tract.

A mechanical soft diet can include many or most foods if they are mashed, puréed, chopped very small, combined with sauce or gravy, or softened in liquid.

In some situations, there are additional restrictions. For example, patients who need to avoid acid reflux, such as those recovering from esophageal surgery for achalasia, are also instructed to stay away from foods that can aggravate reflux, which include alcohol, caffeine, chocolate, citrus fruits, ketchup and other tomato products, mint, and spicy foods. Foods such as blackberries and tomatoes may be restricted because they contain small seeds.

== Alternatives ==
A puréed diet is commonly used for people who have difficulty swallowing and provides a uniformly smooth consistency.

Soft diets, particularly purée foods, can contribute to the high prevalence of malnutrition in those with dysphagia, especially in long-term care residents. Such diets are often less palatable, and a reduction in food intake is common. Also, puréed diets are often poorer in calories, protein, and micronutrients than regular diets.

Most of the foods on this diet can be both puréed and thinned with liquids to be incorporated into a full-liquid diet.

== Examples ==
=== Desserts ===
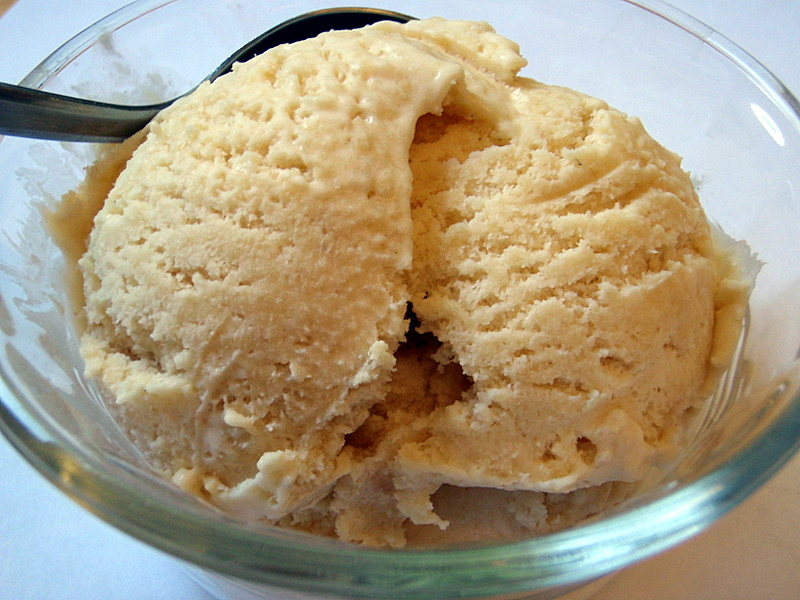
Ice cream - with no chunks of chocolate, no whole nuts or nut bits, nor other hard ingredients - can be part of a soft diet.

- Cake softened with milk or ice cream
- Cheesecake
- Cream pies
- Custard
- Fruit smoothies with crushed ice, milk, soy milk, or yogurt
- Gelatin desserts
- Milkshakes and health shakes
- Mousse
- Soft pies, such as Key lime pie, pumpkin pie, and sweet potato pie
- Pudding
- Smooth frozen desserts such as frozen yogurt, ice cream, Italian ice, popsicles, and sherbet
- Whipped cream or whipped topping

=== Fruits and vegetables ===
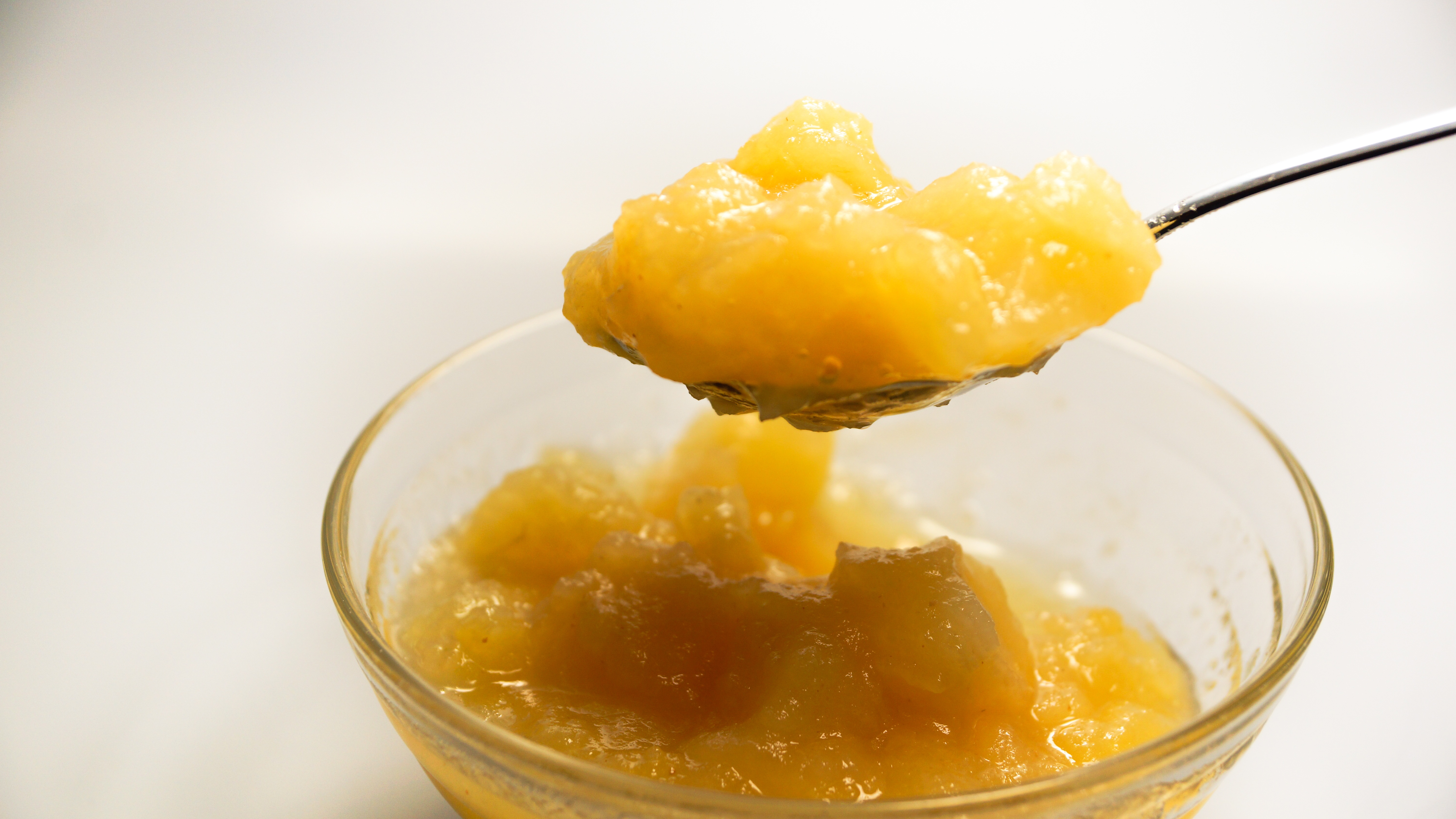
Applesauce and other puréed fruits and vegetables require no chewing.

- Applesauce
- Avocados
- Bananas, mashed if needed
- Creamed corn
- Creamed peas
- Creamed spinach
- Custard apples
- Fruit juices
- Watermelon
- Peeled peaches or pears, very ripe or canned
- Soup with soft-cooked vegetables
- Vegetable juices such as carrot juice or tomato juice
- Vegetables cooked soft, mashed, or puréed

=== Grains/starches ===
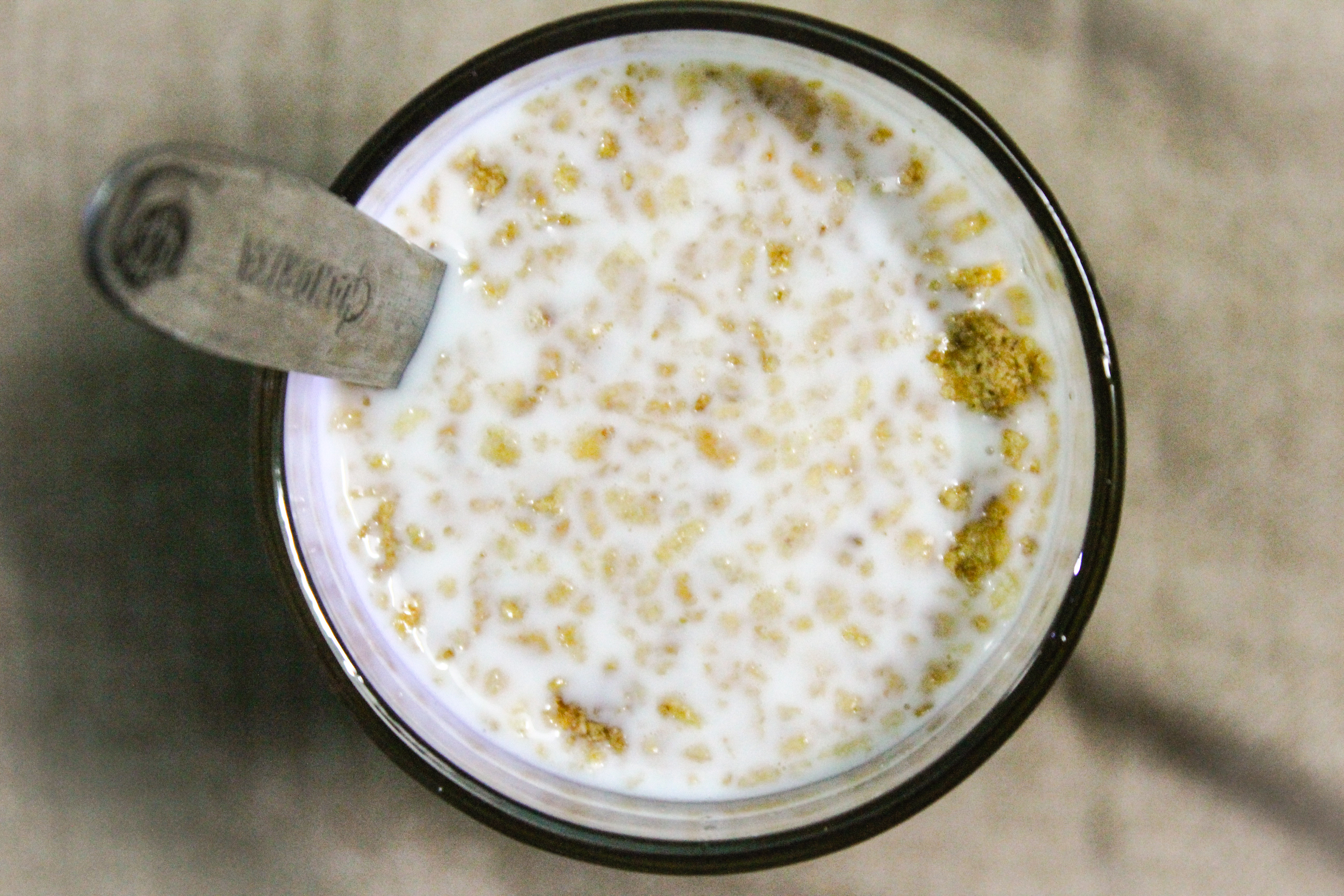
Soggy breakfast cereals requires little or no chewing.

- Baked potatoes, skinless, mashed with sour cream or cream cheese
- Breakfast cereals softened in milk
- Cooked hot cereals such as Cream of Rice, Cream of Wheat, Farina, grits, Maypo, oatmeal, porridge, Weetabix, or Wheatena
- Couscous
- Lasagne with extra sauce
- Macaroni and cheese, cooked soft
- Mashed potatoes and gravy
- Mashed sweet potatoes
- Muffins, pancakes, or waffles, softened with butter or syrup
- Pasta cooked soft
- Polenta
- Potato salad, mashed
- Quinoa
- Rice cooked soft, with sauce or gravy
- Rice gruel or congee
- Risotto

=== Protein ===
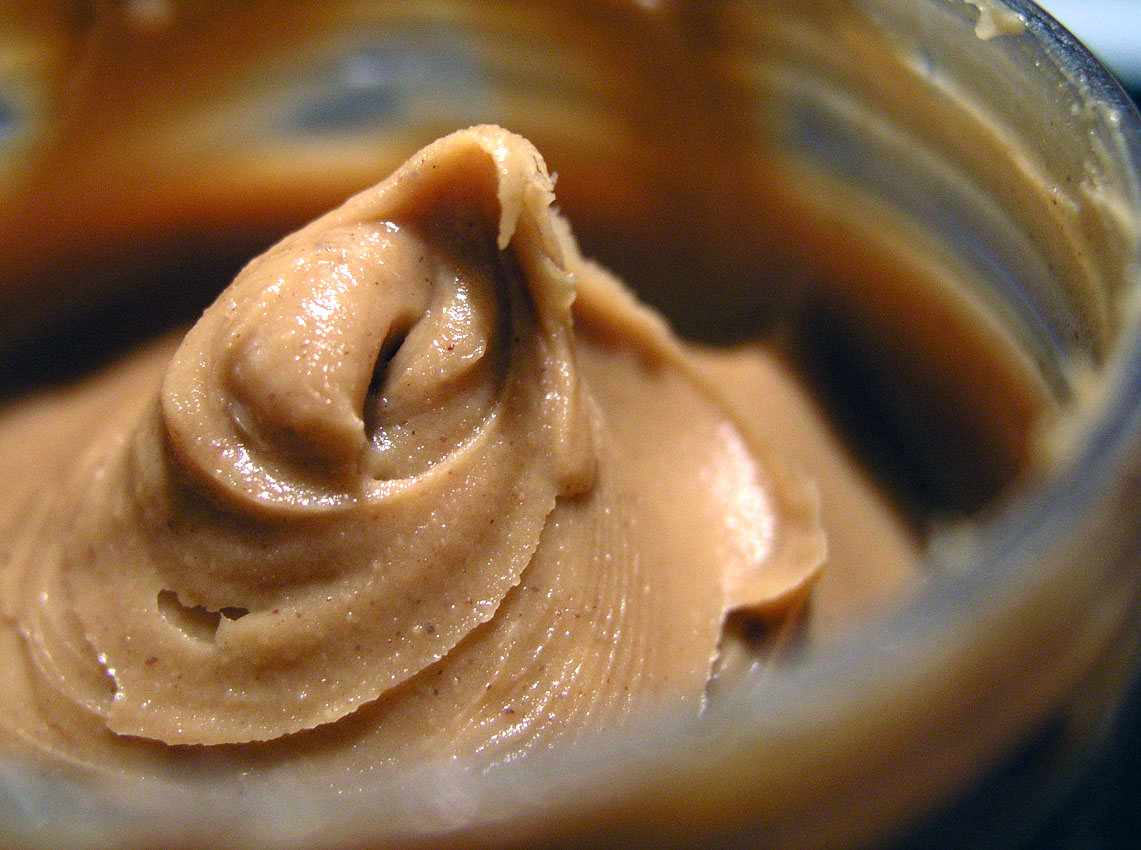
Peanut butter and other nut butters provide protein without needing to chew. However, they may be too thick or sticky for people who have difficulty swallowing.

- Baked beans
- Canned chicken or canned tuna
- Chicken salad or tuna salad
- Chili
- Eggs, scrambled
- Eggs, beaten and steamed
- Cottage cheese
- Enchilada pie
- Fish cooked soft
- Meat in curries, soups, or stews
- Ground meat dishes, such as chili con carne, cottage pie, hamburgers, meatballs, meatloaf
- Nut butter such as almond butter, cashew butter, and peanut butter
- Refried beans with melted cheese, guacamole, salsa, or sour cream
- Ricotta
- Sloppy joe
- Tofu
- Yogurt

== See also ==
- Liquid diet
