= Esophagectomy =

Surgical removal of all or part of the esophagus

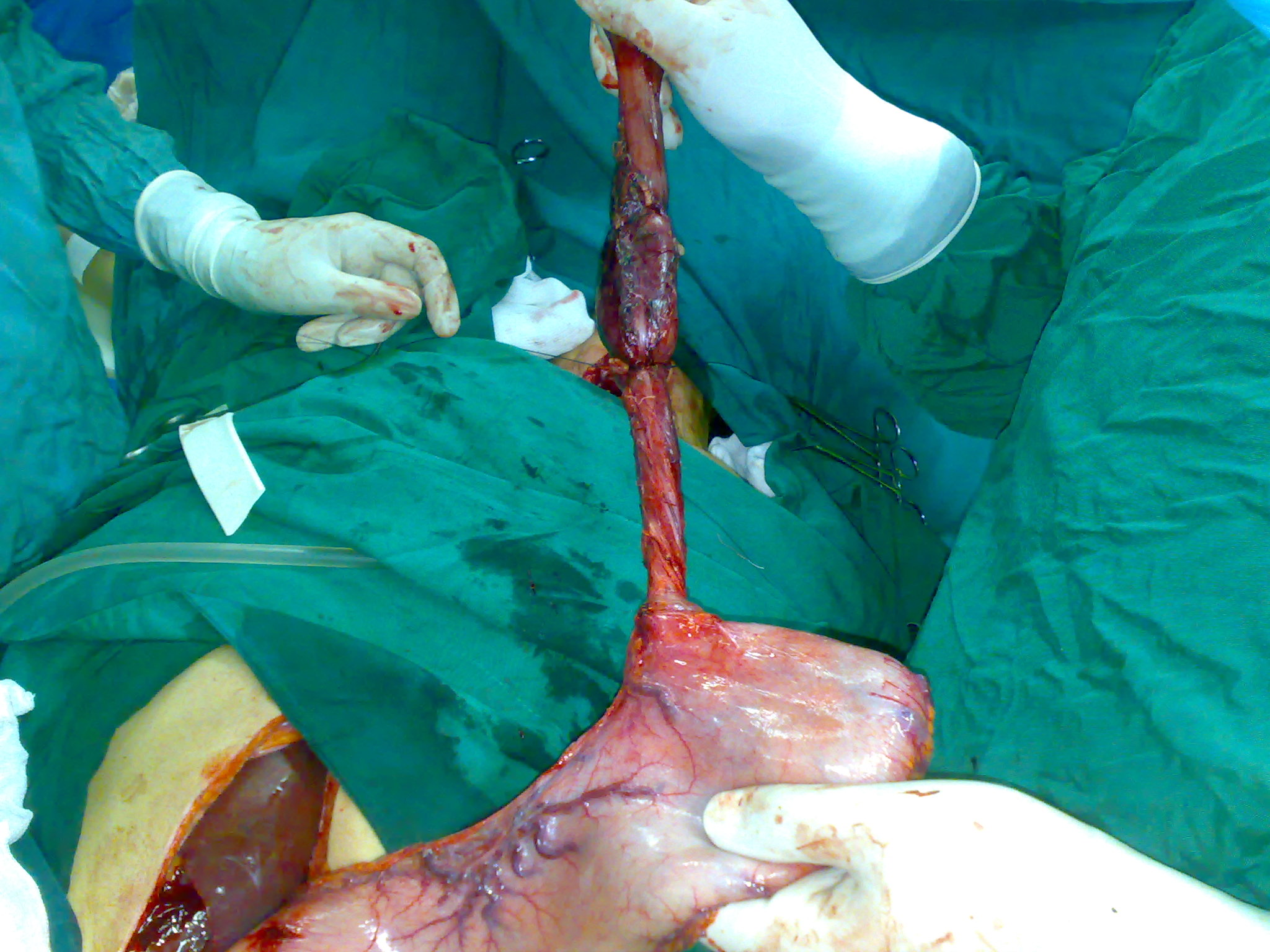
- Surgical removal of the esophagus.
- ICD-9-CM: 42.40
- MeSH: D016629

Esophagectomy or oesophagectomy is the surgical removal of all or parts of the esophagus.

== Medical uses ==
The principal objective is to remove the esophagus, a part of the gastrointestinal tract. This procedure is usually done for patients with esophageal cancer. It is normally done when esophageal cancer is detected early, before it has spread to other parts of the body. Esophagectomy of early-stage cancer represents the best chance of a cure. Despite significant improvements in technique and postoperative care, the long-term survival for esophageal cancer is still poor. Multimodality treatment (chemotherapy and radiation therapy) is needed for advanced tumors. Esophagectomy is also occasionally performed for benign disease such as esophageal atresia in children, achalasia, or caustic injury.

In those who have had an esophagectomy for cancer, omentoplasty (a procedure in which part of the greater omentum is used to cover or fill a defect, augment arterial or portal venous circulation, absorb effusions, or increase lymphatic drainage) appears to improve outcomes.

== Classification ==
Diagram showing before and after an oesophago-gastrectomy

There are two main types of esophagectomy.

- A transhiatal esophagectomy (THE) is performed on the neck and abdomen simultaneously.
- A transthoracic esophagectomy (TTE) involves opening the thorax (chest).

In most cases, the stomach is transplanted into the neck and the stomach takes the place originally occupied by the esophagus. In some cases, the removed esophagus is replaced by another hollow structure, such as the patient's colon.

Another option that is slowly becoming available is minimally invasive surgery (MIS) which is performed laparoscopically and thoracoscopically.

After surgery, patients may have trouble with a regular diet and may have to consume softer foods, avoid liquids at meals, and stay upright for 1–3 hours after eating. Dysphagia is common and patients are encouraged to chew foods very well or grind their food. Patients may complain of substernal pain that resolves by sipping fluids or regurgitating food. Reflux-type symptoms can be severe, including intolerance to acidic foods and large, fatty meals. Jejunal feeding tubes may be placed during surgery to provide a temporary route of nutrition until oral eating resumes.

== Process ==
Esophagectomy is a complex operation that can take multiple hours and is usually performed by surgeons who specialize in thoracic surgery or upper gastrointestinal surgery. Anesthesia for an esophagectomy is also complex, owing to the problems with managing the patient's airway and lung function during the operation.

In the United States, the two most common types of esophagectomy are the Ivor-Lewis and McKeown, or three-hole, esophagectomy. Ivor-Lewis esophagectomy is usually performed for tumors of the distal esophagus including the gastroesophageal junction while the McKeown esophagectomy is ideal for mid to upper esophageal tumors and allows for a high anastomosis within the neck. In the recent decades, the majority of these procedures are performed in a more "minimally invasive" fashion, utilizing advanced laparoscopy or robotic assistance which can improve patient recovery.

However, esophagectomy remains a very morbid procedure with high potential for serious complications and therefore is not undertaken until the patient has been nutritionally optimized and treatable comorbidities have been addressed. Often, even with otherwise very healthy patients, chemoradiation or other "neoadjuvant" therapy is given before surgery after discussion with multidisciplinary team sometimes resulting in a complete response. Even so, esophagectomy is usually indicated in healthy patients even with complete pathologic response. If the patient shows signs of advanced disease on initial staging, such as local or distant metastasis, or the patient is not healthy enough to tolerate surgery, neoadjuvant therapy is prescribed. The patient is either restaged or enrolled in clinical trials for definitive chemoradiation therapy treatment.

Average mortality rates (deaths either in hospital or within 30 days of surgery) for the operation are around 10% in US hospitals. Recognized major cancer hospitals typically report mortality rates under 5%. Major complications occur in 10–20% of patients, and some sort of complication (major and minor) occurs in 40%. Time in hospital is usually 1–2 weeks and recovery time 3–6 months. It is possible for the recovery time to take up to a year.

Following esophagectomy, the esophagus can be replaced using a tube fashioned from the stomach or intestine.

Diagram showing before and after a partial oesophagectomy

Diagram showing before and after a total oesophagectomy

An esophagectomy using the bowel (colon) to replace the esophagus

== See also ==
- List of surgeries by type
