= Esophageal achalasia =

Inability of the sphincter between the esophagus and stomach to open

- Other names: Achalasia cardiae, cardiospasm, esophageal aperistalsis, achalasia
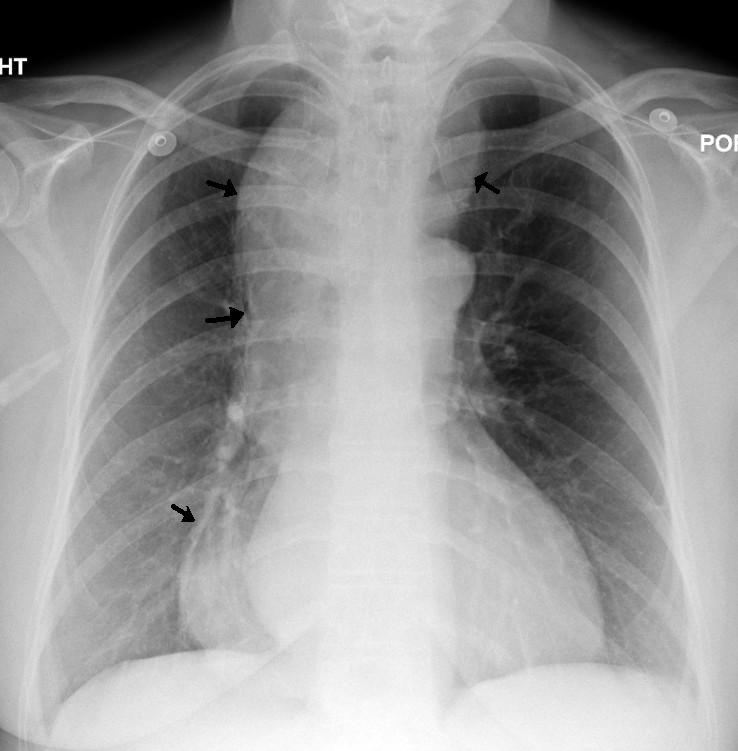
- A chest X-ray showing achalasia (arrows point to the outline of the massively dilated esophagus)
- Pronunciation: /ˌækəˈleɪziə/
- Specialty: Gastroenterology, thoracic surgery, general surgery, laparoscopic surgery
- Symptoms: Anorexia (but willing and trying to eat), inability to swallow food, chest pain comparable to heart attack, lightheadedness, dehydration, excessive vomiting after eating (often without nausea).
- Usual onset: Normally in mid-to-late life, rarely during youth
- Duration: Lifelong
- Types: 1st stage – 2–3 cm dilated, 2nd stage – 4–5 cm dilated, bird beak looking, 3rd stage – 5–7 cm, dilated 4th / Late-stage – 8+ cm dilated, sigmoid
- Causes: Unknown
- Risk factors: Inconclusive, but possibly: history of autoimmune disorders, air-hunger that accompanies anxiety, faulty eating habits, improper diet
- Diagnostic method: Esophageal manometry, biopsy, X-ray, barium swallow study, endoscopy
- Prevention: No method of prevention
- Treatment: Heller myotomy and fundoplomy, POEM, pneumatic dilation, botulinum toxin
- Prognosis: ~76% chance of survival after 20 years (in a western country such as Germany)
- Frequency: ~1 in 100,000 people
- Deaths: 829 in a period of 1–8 years study out of a 28 demographic, 754 million record pool.

Esophageal achalasia, often referred to simply as achalasia, is a failure of smooth muscle fibers to relax, which can cause the lower esophageal sphincter to remain closed. Without a modifier, "achalasia" usually refers to achalasia of the esophagus. Achalasia can happen at various points along the gastrointestinal tract; achalasia of the rectum, for instance, may occur in Hirschsprung's disease. The lower esophageal sphincter is a muscle between the esophagus and stomach that opens when food comes in. It closes to avoid stomach acids from coming back up. A fully understood cause to the disease is unknown, as are factors that increase the risk of its appearance. Suggestions of a genetically transmittable form of achalasia exist, but this is neither fully understood, nor agreed upon.

Esophageal achalasia is an esophageal motility disorder involving the smooth muscle layer of the esophagus and the lower esophageal sphincter (LES). It is characterized by incomplete LES relaxation, increased LES tone, and lack of peristalsis of the esophagus (inability of smooth muscle to move food down the esophagus) in the absence of other explanations like cancer or fibrosis. Conversely, achalasia can provoke other diseases; in particular, esophageal cancer is an important concern. The impaired transmission of food may cause candidiasis in the esophagus, which in turn is a risk factor for cancer.

Achalasia is characterized by difficulty in swallowing, regurgitation, and sometimes chest pain. Diagnosis is reached with esophageal manometry and barium swallow radiographic studies. Various treatments are available, although none cures the condition. Certain medications or botox may be used in some cases, but more permanent relief is brought by esophageal dilatation and surgical cleaving of the muscle (Heller myotomy or POEM).

The most common form is primary achalasia, which has no known underlying cause. It is due to the failure of distal esophageal inhibitory neurons. However, a small proportion occurs secondary to other conditions, such as esophageal cancer, Chagas disease (an infectious disease common in South America) or Triple-A syndrome. Achalasia affects about one person in 100,000 per year. There is no gender predominance for the occurrence of disease. The term is from a- + -chalasia "no relaxation."

Achalasia can also manifest alongside other diseases as a rare syndrome such as achalasia microcephaly.

== History ==
- In 1674 "Pharmaceutice rationalis (p. 45)". Internet Archive. 1674., the English physician Sir Thomas Willis, one of the founders of the Royal Society first described the condition now known as achalasia and treated the problem with a dilation using a sea sponge attached to a whale bone.
- In 1881, the German Polish-Austrian physician Johann Freiherr von Mikulicz-Radecki described the disease as cardiospasm, and felt it was a functional problem rather than a mechanical one.
- In 1913, Ernest Heller became the first person to successfully perform an esophagomyotomy, now known in his namesake as the Heller myotomy.
- In 1929, two physicians – Hurst and Rake – figured out that the problem was due to the LES not relaxing. They named the disease achalasia, meaning inability to relax.
- In 1937, the physician F.C. Lendram affirmed the conclusions of Hurst and Rake in 1929, forwarding the usage of the term achalasia over cardiospasm.
- In 1955, the German physician Rudolph Nissen, a student of Ferdinand Sauerbruch, performed the first fundoplomy, now known in his namesake as the Nissen fundoplication, eventually publishing the results of two cases in a 1956 copy of Swiss Medical Weekly.
- In 1962, the physician Dor reported the first anterior partial fundoplication, acting as a solution to the intense post-surgery GERD and risk of stomach acid inhalation accompanying Heller myotomy.
- In 1963, the physician Toupet reported the first posterior partial fundoplication.
- In 1991, the physician Shimi and his colleagues performed the first laparoscopic Heller myotomy in England.
- In 1994, Paricha et al. introduced botox as a method for reducing LES pressure.
- In 2008, the newest method of surgically treating achalasia, the per-oral endoscopic myotomy, was devised by H. Inoue in Tokyo, Japan. This method is currently considered experimental in many countries such as the United States.

== Signs and symptoms ==
The main symptoms of achalasia are dysphagia (difficulty in swallowing), regurgitation of undigested food, chest pain behind the sternum, and weight loss. Dysphagia tends to become progressively worse over time and to involve both fluids and solids. Some people may also experience coughing when lying in a horizontal position. The chest pain experienced, also known as cardiospasm and non-cardiac chest pain can often be mistaken for a heart attack. It can be extremely painful in some patients. Food and liquid, including saliva, are retained in the esophagus and may be inhaled into the lungs (aspiration). Untreated, mid-stage achalasia can fully obstruct the passage of almost any food or liquid – the greater surface area of the swallowed object often being more difficult to pass the LES/LOS (lower esophageal sphincter). At such a stage, upon swallowing food, it entirely remains in the esophagus, building up and stretching it to an extreme size in a phenomenon known as megaesophagus. If enough food builds up, it triggers a need to purge what was swallowed, often described as not being accompanied with nausea per se, but an intense and sometimes uncontrollable need to vomit what was built up in the esophagus that, due to the excessive stretching of the esophageal walls, is easily released without heaving. This cycle is so that little to practically no food reaches the small intestines to have its nutrients be absorbed into the bloodstream, leading to progressive weight loss, anorexia, eventual starvation, and death, the final of which may not always be listed as "death by achalasia", contributing to the already inaccurate or inconclusive count of deaths caused by the disease, not to mention the variable of other medical factors that could accelerate death of an achalasia patient's already weakened body.

=== Late-stage achalasia ===
End-stage achalasia, typified by a massively dilated and tortuous oesophagus, may occur in patients previously treated but where further dilatation or myotomy fails to relieve dysphagia or prevent nutritional deterioration, and esophagectomy may be the only option.

End stage disease, characterised by a markedly dilated and tortuous "burned-out" esophagus and recurrent obstructive symptoms, may require oesophageal resection in order to restore gastro-intestinal function, reverse nutritional deficits and reduce the risk of aspiration pneumonia.

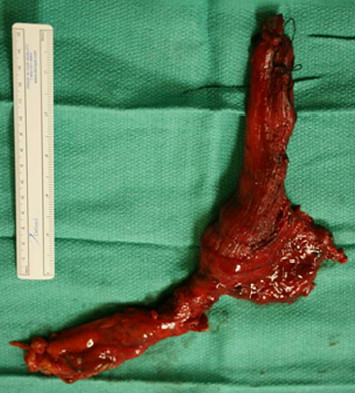
Transhiatal oesophagectomy specimen from a patient with late-stage achalasia. Diverticulum at the left lower end of the oesophagus.

A review of the literature shows similar results with good symptom control reported in 75–100% of patients undergoing such a procedure. However, oesophagectomy is not without risk, and every patient must be fully informed of all associated risks. Reported mortality rates of 5–10% are described, while morbidity rates of up to 50% have been reported, and anastomotic leak in 10–20% of patients. Patients must also be informed of longer-term complications. Anastomotic stricture has been reported in up to 50% of patients, depending on length of post-operative follow-up. Dumping syndrome, reported in up to 20% of patients, tends to be self-limiting and may be managed medically if necessary, and vagal-sparing oesophagectomy may reduce this risk.

== Mechanism ==
The cause of most cases of achalasia is unknown. LES pressure and relaxation are regulated by excitatory (e.g., acetylcholine, substance P) and inhibitory (e.g., nitric oxide, vasoactive intestinal peptide) neurotransmitters. People with achalasia lack noradrenergic, noncholinergic, inhibitory ganglion cells, causing an imbalance in excitatory and inhibitory neurotransmission. The result is a hypertensive nonrelaxed esophageal sphincter.

Autopsy and myotomy specimens have, on histological examination, shown an inflammatory response consisting of CD3/CD8-positive cytotoxic T lymphocytes, variable numbers of eosinophils and mast cells, loss of ganglion cells, and neurofibrosis; these events appear to occur early in achalasia. Thus, it seems there is an autoimmune context to achalasia, most likely caused by viral triggers. Other studies suggest hereditary, neurodegenerative, genetic and infective contributions.

== Diagnosis ==
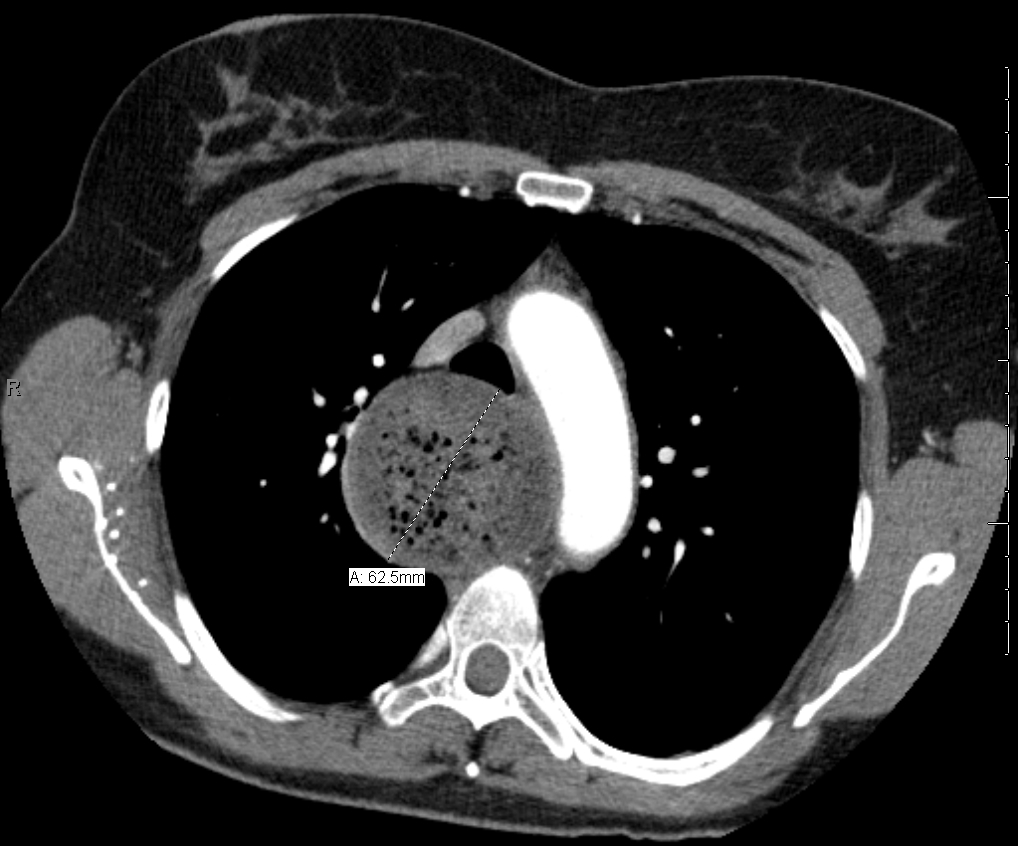
An axial CT image showing marked dilatation of the esophagus in a person with achalasia.

Due to the similarity of symptoms, achalasia can be mistaken for more common disorders such as gastroesophageal reflux disease (GERD), hiatus hernia, and even psychosomatic disorders. Specific tests for achalasia are barium swallow and esophageal manometry. In addition, endoscopy of the esophagus, stomach, and duodenum (esophagogastroduodenoscopy or EGD), with or without endoscopic ultrasound, is typically performed to rule out the possibility of cancer. The internal tissue of the esophagus generally appears normal in endoscopy, although a "pop" may be observed as the scope is passed through the non-relaxing lower esophageal sphincter with some difficulty, and food debris may be found above the LES.

=== Barium swallow ===
"Bird's beak" appearance and "megaesophagus", typical in achalasia.

The patient swallows a barium solution, with continuous fluoroscopy (X-ray recording) to observe the flow of the fluid through the esophagus. Normal peristaltic movement of the esophagus is not seen. There is acute tapering at the lower esophageal sphincter and narrowing at the gastro-esophageal junction, producing a "bird's beak" or "rat's tail" appearance. The esophagus above the narrowing is often dilated (enlarged) to varying degrees as the esophagus is gradually stretched over time. An air-fluid margin is often seen over the barium column due to the lack of peristalsis. A five-minutes timed barium swallow can provide a useful benchmark to measure the effectiveness of treatment.

=== Esophageal manometry ===
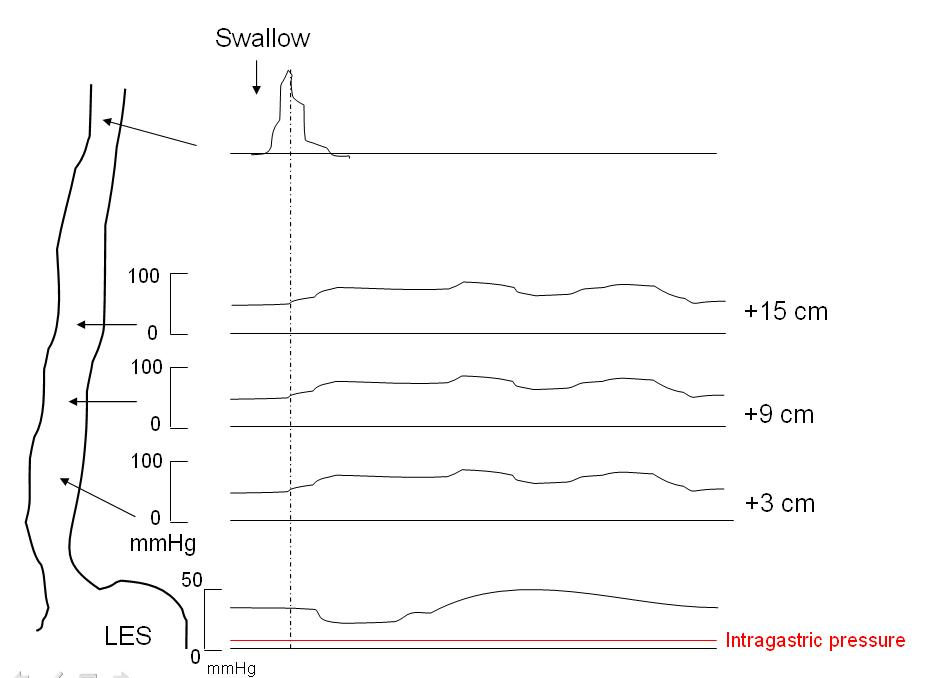
Schematic of manometry in achalasia showing aperistaltic contractions, increased intraesophageal pressure, and failure of relaxation of the lower esophageal sphincter.

Because of its sensitivity, manometry (esophageal motility study) is considered the key test for establishing the diagnosis. A catheter (thin tube) is inserted through the nose, and the patient is instructed to swallow several times. The probe measures muscle contractions in different parts of the esophagus during the act of swallowing. Manometry reveals failure of the LES to relax with swallowing and lack of functional peristalsis in the smooth muscle esophagus.

Characteristic manometric findings are:

- Lower esophageal sphincter (LES) fails to relax upon wet swallow (<75% relaxation)
- Pressure of LES <26 mm Hg is normal, >100 is considered achalasia, > 200 is nutcracker achalasia.
- Aperistalsis in esophageal body
- Relative increase in intra-esophageal pressure as compared with intra-gastric pressure

=== Biopsy ===
Biopsy, the removal of a tissue sample during endoscopy, is not typically necessary in achalasia but if performed shows hypertrophied musculature and absence of certain nerve cells of the myenteric plexus, a network of nerve fibers that controls esophageal peristalsis. It is not possible to diagnose achalasia by means of biopsy alone.

== Treatment ==
Sublingual nifedipine significantly improves outcomes in 75% of people with mild or moderate disease. It was classically considered that surgical myotomy provided greater benefit than either botulinum toxin or dilation in those who fail medical management. However, a recent randomized controlled trial found pneumatic dilation to be non-inferior to laparoscopic Heller myotomy.

=== Lifestyle changes ===
Both before and after treatment, achalasia patients may need to eat slowly, chew very well, drink plenty of water with meals, and avoid eating near bedtime. Raising the head off the bed or sleeping with a wedge pillow promotes emptying of the esophagus by gravity. After surgery or pneumatic dilatation, proton pump inhibitors are required to prevent reflux damage by inhibiting gastric acid secretion, and foods that can aggravate reflux, including ketchup, citrus, chocolate, alcohol, and caffeine, may need to be avoided. If untreated or particularly aggressive, irritation and corrosion caused by acids can lead to Barrett's esophagus.

=== Medication ===
Drugs that reduce LES pressure are useful. These include calcium channel blockers such as nifedipine and nitrates such as isosorbide dinitrate and nitroglycerin. However, many patients experience unpleasant side effects such as headache and swollen feet, and these medications often stop helping after several months.

Botulinum toxin (botox) may be injected into the lower esophageal sphincter to paralyze the muscles holding it shut. As in the case of cosmetic botox, the effect is only temporary and lasts about 6 months. Botox injections cause scarring in the sphincter which may increase the difficulty of later Heller myotomy. This therapy is recommended only for patients who cannot risk surgery, such as elderly people in poor health. Pneumatic dilatation has a better long term effectiveness than botox.

=== Pneumatic dilatation ===
In balloon (pneumatic) dilation or dilatation, the muscle fibers are stretched and slightly torn by forceful inflation of a balloon placed inside the lower esophageal sphincter. There is always a small risk of a perforation which requires immediate surgical repair. Pneumatic dilatation causes some scarring which may increase the difficulty of Heller myotomy if the surgery is needed later. Gastroesophageal reflux (GERD) occurs after pneumatic dilatation in many patients. Pneumatic dilatation is most effective in the long-term on patients over the age of 40; the benefits tend to be shorter-lived in younger patients due to the body's higher rate of recovery from trauma, often resulting in repeat procedures with larger balloons to achieve maximum effectiveness. After multiple failures using pneumatic dilation, surgeries such as the more consistently successful Heller myotomy can be attempted instead.

=== Surgery ===
Heller myotomy helps 90% of achalasia patients. It can usually be performed by a keyhole approach or laparoscopically. The myotomy is a lengthwise cut along the esophagus, starting above the LES and extending down 1 to 2 cm onto the gastric cardia. The esophagus is made of several layers, and the myotomy cuts only through the outside muscle layers which are squeezing it shut, leaving the inner mucosal layer intact.

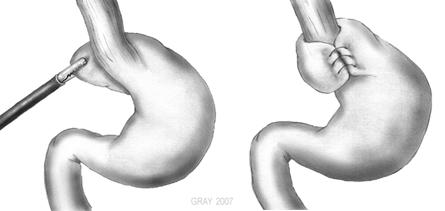
Image of a stomach which has undergone Fundoplomy

A partial fundoplication or "wrap", where the fundus (part of the stomach which hangs above the connection to the oesophagus) is wrapped around said lower oesophagus and sewn to itself, secured to the diaphragm to create pressure on the sphincter post-myotomy, is generally added in order to prevent excessive reflux, which can cause serious damage to the esophagus over time. After surgery, patients should keep to a soft diet for several weeks to a month, avoiding foods that can aggravate reflux. The most recommended fundoplication to complement Heller myotomy is Dor fundoplication, which consists of a 180- to 200-degree anterior wrap around the esophagus. It provides excellent results as compared to Nissen's fundoplication, which is associated with higher incidence of postoperative dysphagia. Current evidence suggests that partial fundoplications such as Dor or Toupet result in similar rates of postoperative reflux and dysphagia, although the certainty of this evidence is low. In contrast, total (Nissen) fundoplication has been associated with a higher risk of severe postoperative dysphagia.

The shortcoming of laparoscopic esophageal myotomy is the need for a fundoplication. On the one hand, the myotomy opens the esophagus, while on the other hand, the fundoplication causes an obstruction. Recent understanding of the gastroesophageal antireflux barrier/valve has shed light on the reason for the occurrence of reflux following myotomy. The gastroesophageal valve is the result of infolding of the esophagus into the stomach at the esophageal hiatus. This infolding creates a valve that extends from 7 o'clock to 4 o'clock (270 degrees) around the circumference of the esophagus. Laparoscopic myotomy cuts the muscle at the 12 o'clock position, resulting in incompetence of the valve and reflux. Recent robotic laparoscopic series have attempted a myotomy at the 5 o'clock position on the esophagus away from the valve. The robotic lateral esophageal myotomy preserves the esophageal valve and does not result in reflux, thereby obviating the need for a fundoplication. The robotic lateral esophageal myotomy has had the best results to date in terms of the ability to eat without reflux.

=== Endoscopic myotomy ===
A new endoscopic therapy for achalasia management was developed in 2008 in Japan. Per-oral endoscopic myotomy or POEM is a minimally invasive type of natural orifice transluminal endoscopic surgery that follows the same principle as the Heller myotomy. A tiny incision is made on the esophageal mucosa through which an endoscope is inserted. The innermost circular muscle layer of the esophagus is divided and extended through the LES until about 2 cm into the gastric muscle. Since this procedure is performed entirely through the patient's mouth, there are no visible scars on the patient's body.

Patients usually spend about 1–4 days in the hospital and are discharged after satisfactory examinations. Patients are discharged on full diet and generally able to return to work and full activity immediately upon discharge. Major complications are rare after POEM and are generally managed without intervention. Long term patient satisfaction is similar following POEM compared to standard laparoscopic Heller myotomy.

POEM has been performed on over 1,200 patients in Japan and is becoming increasingly popular internationally as a first-line therapy in patients with achalasia.

=== Monitoring ===
Even after successful treatment of achalasia, swallowing may still deteriorate over time. The esophagus should be checked every year or two with a timed barium swallow because some may need pneumatic dilatations, a repeat myotomy, or even esophagectomy after many years. In addition, some physicians recommend pH testing and endoscopy to check for reflux damage, which may lead to a premalignant condition known as Barrett's esophagus or a stricture if untreated.

== Epidemiology ==
Incidence of achalasia has risen to approximately 1.6 per 100,000 in some populations. Disease affects mostly adults between ages 30s and 50s.

== Notable patients ==
Planetary scientist Carl Sagan had achalasia from the age of 18. The Zambian government announced that the President of Zambia Edgar Lungu has achalasia, bearing symptoms that sometimes occur during official engagements, in particular lightheadedness. Linebacker and MVP for Super Bowl XLVIII Malcolm Smith developed symptoms while in college. After a procedure and learning to manage eating, Smith had an 11 year NFL career. American actor Matthew Gray Gubler once revealed on The Late Late Show with Craig Ferguson that he suffers from achalasia, which left him unable to eat or drink normally for 26 days.
