= Esophageal dilation =

Therapeutic endoscopic procedure that widens the esophagus

Esophageal dilatation
- Specialty: Gastroenterology

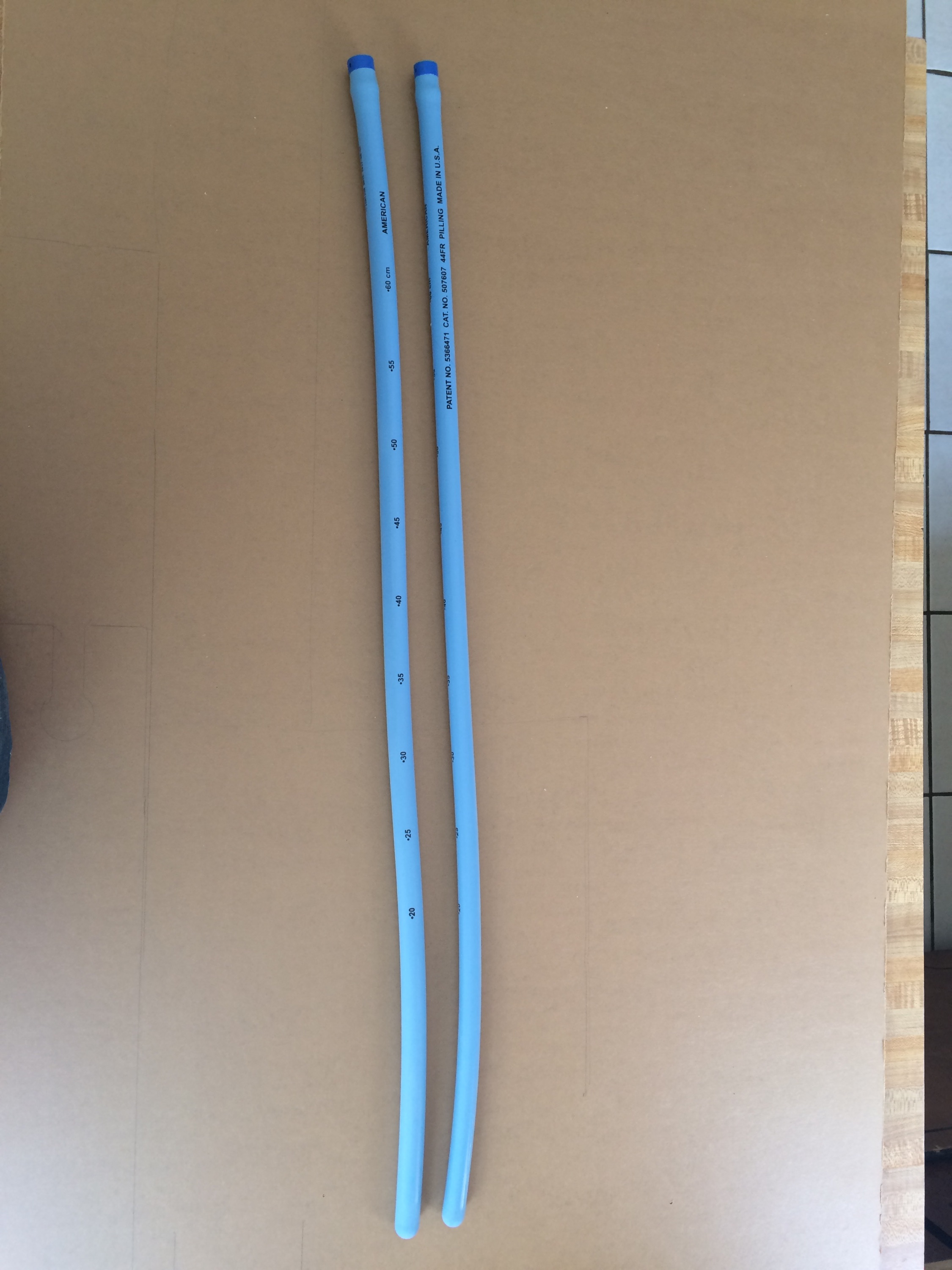
Esophagal bougie dilator

Esophageal dilation, or oesophageal dilatation (British English), is a therapeutic endoscopic procedure that enlarges the lumen of the esophagus.

== Indications ==
It can be used to treat a number of medical conditions that result in narrowing of the esophageal lumen or decrease motility in the distal esophagus. These include the following:

- Peptic stricture
- Eosinophilic esophagitis
- Schatzki rings
- Achalasia
- Scleroderma esophagus
- Esophageal cancer

== Types of dilators ==
There are three major classes of dilators:

- Mercury or tungsten-weighted bougies have blindly inserted bougies placed into the esophagus by the treating physician. They are passed in sequentially increasing sizes to dilate the obstructed area. They must be used with precaution in patients with narrow strictures, as they may curl proximal to the obstruction.
- Bougie over guidewire dilators are used at the time of gastroscopy or fluoroscopy. An endoscopy is usually performed first to evaluate the anatomy, and a guidewire is passed into the stomach past the obstruction. This may also be done fluoroscopically. Bougies are again introduced—this time over the guidewire—in sequentially increasing sizes.
- Pneumatic dilatation or balloon dilatation is also typically done at the time of endoscopy or fluoroscopy. A balloon is inserted in the deflated form into the area of narrowing. It is then inflated with air to a certain pressure that is pre-set for a given circumference.

== Complications ==
Complications of esophageal dilatation include the following:

- Odynophagia, or painful swallowing
- Hematemesis, or bloody vomit
- Esophageal perforation
- Mediastinitis
