= Esophageal dysphagia =

- Specialty: Gastroenterology

Esophageal dysphagia is a form of dysphagia where the underlying cause arises from the body of the esophagus, lower esophageal sphincter, or cardia of the stomach, usually due to mechanical causes or motility problems.

== Signs and symptoms ==
Patients usually complain of dysphagia (the feeling of food getting stuck several seconds after swallowing), and will point to the suprasternal notch or behind the sternum as the site of obstruction.

== Causes ==
If there is dysphagia to both solids and liquids, then it is most likely a motility problem. If there is dysphagia initially to solids but progresses to also involve liquids, then it is most likely a mechanical obstruction. Whether the dysphagia is intermittent or progressive is important. An intermittent motility dysphagia likely can be diffuse esophageal spasm (DES) or nonspecific esophageal motility disorder (NEMD). Progressive motility dysphagia disorders include scleroderma or achalasia with chronic heartburn, regurgitation, respiratory problems, or weight loss. Intermittent mechanical dysphagia is likely to be an esophageal ring. Progressive mechanical dysphagia is most likely due to peptic stricture or esophageal cancer.

This can be presented as a tree diagram:

Esophageal dysphagia
Solids & liquids (Neuromuscular)	Solids only (Mechanical obstruction)
Progressive	Intermittent	Intermittent	Progressive
Scleroderma	Achalasia	Diffuse esophageal spasm	Lower esophageal ring	Cancer	Peptic stricture

== Differential diagnosis ==
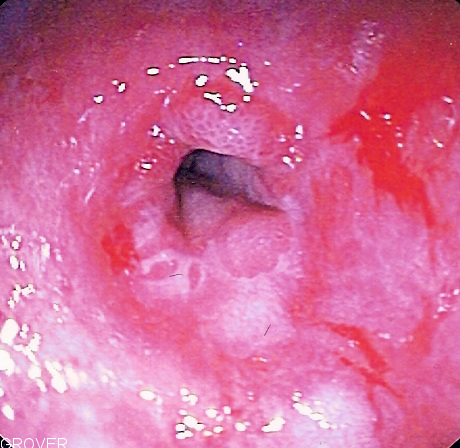
Endoscopic image of a non-cancerous peptic stricture, or narrowing of the esophagus, near the junction with the stomach. This is a complication of chronic gastroesophageal reflux disease, and can be a cause of dysphagia. The stricture is about 3 to 5 mm in diameter. The blood that is visible is from the endoscope bumping into the stricture.

Esophageal stricture, or narrowing of the esophagus, is usually a complication of acid reflux, most commonly due to gastroesophageal reflux disease (GERD). These patients are usually older and have had GERD for a long time. Esophageal stricture can also be due to other causes, such as acid reflux from Zollinger–Ellison syndrome, trauma from a nasogastric tube placement, and chronic acid exposure in patients with poor esophageal motility from scleroderma. Other non-acid related causes of peptic strictures include infectious esophagitis, ingestion of chemical irritant, pill irritation, and radiation. Peptic stricture is a progressive mechanical dysphagia, meaning patients will complain of initial intolerance to solids followed by inability to tolerate liquids. When the diameter of the stricture is less than 12 mm the patient will always have dysphagia, while dysphagia is not seen when the diameter of the stricture is above 30 mm. Symptoms relating to the underlying cause of the stricture usually will also be present.

Esophageal cancer also presents with progressive mechanical dysphagia. Patients usually come with rapidly progressive dysphagia first with solids then with liquids, weight loss (> 10 kg), and anorexia (loss of appetite). Esophageal cancer usually affects the elderly. Esophageal cancers can be either squamous cell carcinoma or adenocarcinoma. Adenocarcinoma is the most prevalent in the US and is associated with patients with chronic GERD who have developed Barrett's esophagus (intestinal metaplasia of esophageal mucosa). Squamous cell carcinoma is more prevalent in Asia and is associated with tobacco smoking and alcohol use.

Esophageal rings and webs, are actual rings and webs of tissue that may occlude the esophageal lumen.

- Rings --- Also known as Schatzki rings from the discoverer, these rings are usually mucosal rings rather than muscular rings, and are located near the gastroesophageal junction at the squamo-columnar junction. Presence of multiple rings may suggest eosinophilic esophagitis. Rings cause intermittent mechanical dysphagia, meaning patients will usually present with transient discomfort and regurgitation while swallowing solids and then liquids, depending on the constriction of the ring.
- Webs --- Usually squamous mucosal protrusion into the esophageal lumen, especially anterior cervical esophagus behind the cricoid area. Patients are usually asymptomatic or have intermittent dysphagia. An important association of esophageal webs is to the Plummer–Vinson syndrome in iron deficiency, in which case patients will also have anemia, koilonychia, fatigue, and other symptoms of anemia.

Achalasia is an idiopathic motility disorder characterized by failure of lower esophageal sphincter (LES) relaxation as well as loss of peristalsis in the distal esophagus, which is mostly smooth muscle. Both of these features impair the ability of the esophagus to empty contents into the stomach. Patients usually complain of dysphagia to both solids and liquids. Dysphagia to liquids, in particular, is a characteristic of achalasia. Other symptoms of achalasia include regurgitation, night coughing, chest pain, weight loss, and heartburn. The combination of achalasia, adrenal insufficiency, and alacrima (lack of tear production) in children is known as the triple-A (Allgrove) syndrome. In most cases the cause is unknown (idiopathic), but in some regions of the world, achalasia can also be caused by Chagas disease due to infection by Trypanosoma cruzi.

Scleroderma is a disease characterized by atrophy and sclerosis of the gut wall, most commonly of the distal esophagus (~90%). Consequently, the lower esophageal sphincter cannot close and this can lead to severe gastroesophageal reflux disease (GERD). Patients typically present with progressive dysphagia to both solids and liquids secondary to motility problems or peptic stricture from acid reflux.

Spastic motility disorders include diffuse esophageal spasm (DES), nutcracker esophagus, hypertensive lower esophageal sphincter, and nonspecific spastic esophageal motility disorders (NEMD).

- DES can be caused by many factors that affect muscular or neural functions, including acid reflux, stress, hot or cold food, or carbonated drinks. Patients present with intermittent dysphagia, chest pain, or heartburn.

Rare causes of esophageal dysphagia not mentioned above

- Diverticulum
- Aberrant subclavian artery, or (dysphagia lusoria)
- Cervical osteophytes
- Enlarged aorta
- Enlarged left atrium
- Mediastinal tumor

== Diagnostic tools ==
Once a patient complains of dysphagia they should have an upper endoscopy (EGD). Commonly patients are found to have esophagitis and may have an esophageal stricture. Biopsies are usually done to look for evidence of esophagitis even if the EGD is normal. Usually no further testing is required if the diagnosis is established on EGD. Repeat endoscopy may be needed for follow up.

If there is a suspicion of a proximal lesion such as:

- history of surgery for laryngeal or esophageal cancer
- history of radiation or irritating injury
- achalasia
- Zenker's diverticulum

a barium swallow may be performed before endoscopy to help identify abnormalities that might increase the risk of perforation at the time of endoscopy.

If achalasia suspected an upper endoscopy is required to exclude a malignancy as a cause of the findings on barium swallow. Manometry is performed next to confirm. A normal endoscopy should be followed by manometry, and if manometry is also normal, the diagnosis is functional dysphagia.

== Treatment ==
The patient is generally sent for a GI, pulmonary, or ENT, depending on the suspected underlying cause. Consultations with a speech therapist and registered dietitian nutritionist (RDN) are also needed, as many patients may need dietary modifications such as thickened fluids.
