= Esophageal food bolus obstruction =

Blockage of the esophagus by a food bolus

- Other names: Steakhouse syndrome
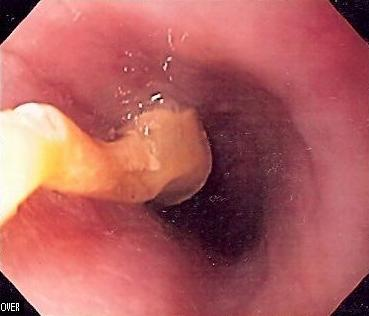
- Endoscopic image of patient with esophageal food bolus obstruction due to a grape in the setting of eosinophilic esophagitis
- Specialty: Emergency medicine, general surgery, gastroenterology

An esophageal food bolus obstruction is a medical emergency caused by the obstruction of the esophagus by a food bolus. It is distinct from choking, which is an obstruction of the airway.

It is usually associated with diseases that may narrow the lumen of the esophagus, such as eosinophilic esophagitis, Schatzki rings, peptic strictures, webs, or cancers of the esophagus; rarely it can be seen in disorders of the movement of the esophagus, such as nutcracker esophagus.

While some esophageal food boli can pass by themselves or with the assistance of medications, some require endoscopy to push the obstructing food into the stomach, or remove it from the esophagus. The use of glucagon, while common, is not useful.

Eponymous names include 'the steakhouse syndrome' and 'backyard barbeque syndrome'.

== Signs and symptoms ==
Many foods can lodge themselves in the esophagus, but the most common are meats such as steak, poultry, or pork leading to the colourful description of the phenomenon as steakhouse syndrome. People with food bolus obstruction typically display acute dysphagia (difficulty swallowing), often to the point that they cannot even swallow their saliva, leading to drooling. They may also experience chest pain, neck pain, regurgitation of food, or painful swallowing (odynophagia).

Patients with esophageal food boluses are also at risk of complications, such as perforation of the esophagus, and aspiration into the lungs. As a result, urgent treatment of patients with high-risk features, or a lengthy duration of symptoms, is recommended.

== Risk factors ==
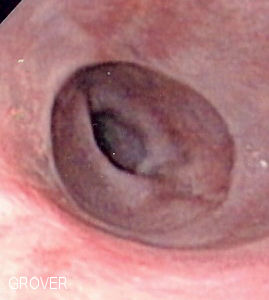
Endoscopic image of a Schatzki ring, which is a common cause of esophageal food bolus obstruction

Food bolus obstruction is most commonly caused by Schatzki rings, which are mucosal rings of unknown cause in the lower esophagus. A food bolus can more easily become lodged in the esophagus due to the narrowing caused by the ring. An increasingly commonly recognized cause for esophageal food bolus obstruction is eosinophilic esophagitis, which is an inflammatory disorder of the mucosa of the esophagus, of unknown cause. Many alterations caused by eosinophilic esophagitis can predispose to food bolus obstruction; these include the presence of multiple rings and narrowing of the lumen. When considering esophageal dilation to treat a patient with food bolus obstruction, care must be made to look for features of eosinophilic esophagitis, as these patients are at a higher risk of dilation-associated complications.

Other conditions that predispose to food bolus obstructions are esophageal webs, tracheoesophageal fistula/esophageal atresia (TOF/OA) and peptic strictures. Food boluses are common in the course of illness in patients with esophageal cancer but are more difficult to treat as endoscopy to push the bolus is less safe. Patients with esophageal self-expandable metallic stents may present with food boluses lodged within the stent lumen. Rarely, disorders of movement of the esophagus, such as nutcracker esophagus, can predispose to food bolus obstruction.

== Treatment ==
=== Conservative ===
In an emergency room setting, someone with a food bolus obstruction may be observed for a period to see if the food bolus passes spontaneously. This may be encouraged by giving carbonated drinks that release gas, such as Coca-Cola, which may dislodge the food.

While glucagon has been used in those with esophageal food bolus obstruction, evidence as of 2019 does not support its effectiveness, and its use may result in more side effects. Older reviews considered it an acceptable option as long it does not lead to delays in arranging other treatments. Other medications (hyoscine butylbromide, benzodiazepines and opioids) have been studied but the evidence is limited. Hyoscine butylbromide (also known as Buscopan) is used intravenously as a treatment in some cases, although there is a small risk of serious side effects in people who may have underlying cardiac issues such as high blood pressure, tachycardia, or heart disease.

Historical treatment of food bolus obstruction included administration of proteolytic enzymes (such as meat tenderizers) with the purpose of degrading the meat that was blocked; however, it is possible that these methods may increase the risk of perforation of the esophagus. Other modalities rarely used now include removal of boluses using catheters, and the use of large-bore tubes inserted into the esophagus to forcefully lavage it.

=== Endoscopic ===
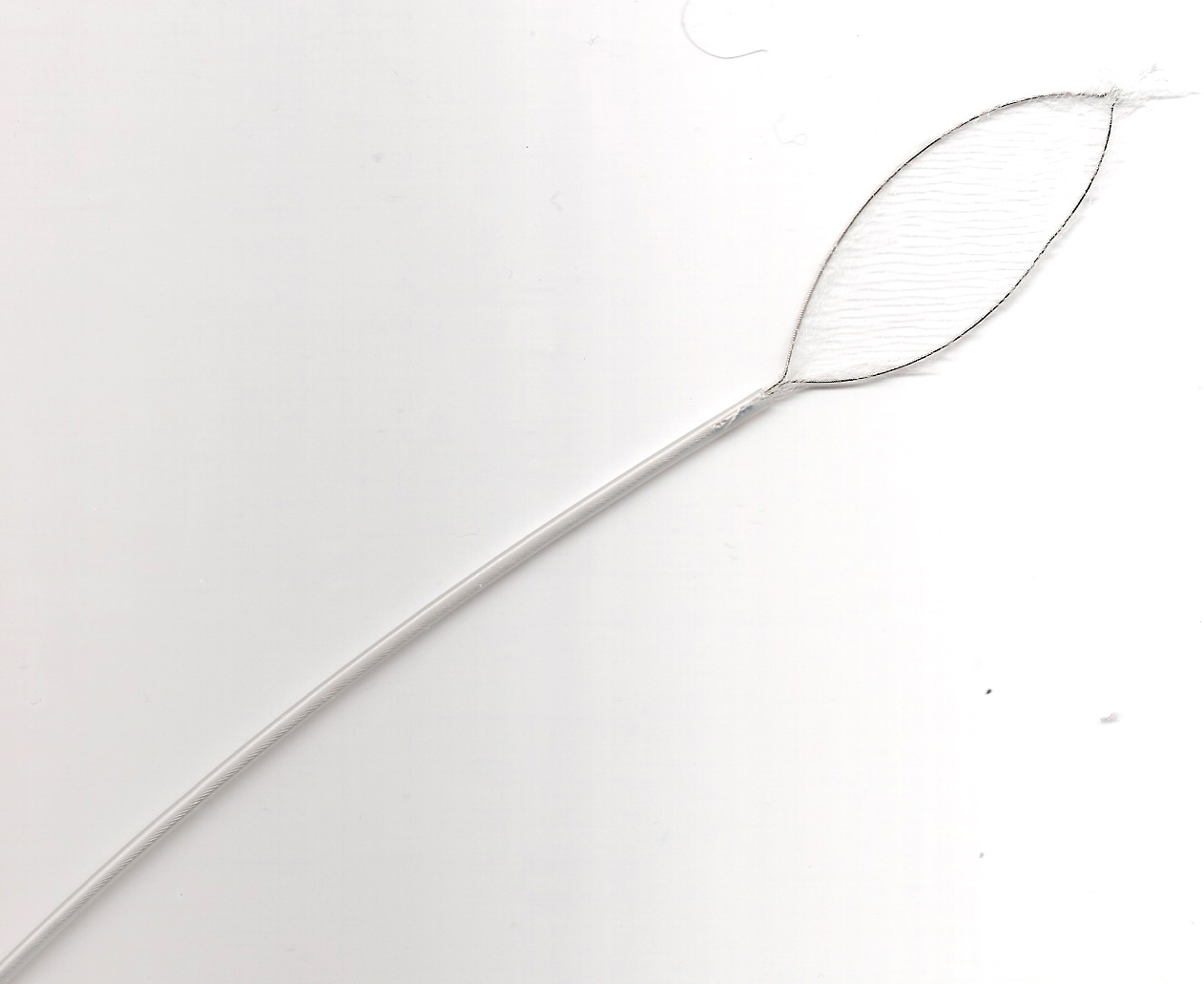
The Roth net can be inserted through the endoscope to remove pieces of the obstructed food.

The standard treatment of food bolus obstruction is the use of endoscopy or fibre-optic cameras inserted by mouth into the esophagus. Endoscopes can be used to diagnose the cause of the food bolus obstruction, as well as to remove the obstruction. Traditional endoscopic techniques involved the use of an overtube, a plastic tube inserted into the esophagus prior to the removal of the food bolus, to reduce the risk of aspiration into the lungs at the time of endoscopy. However, the "push technique", which involves insufflating air into the esophagus and gently pushing the bolus toward the stomach instead, has emerged as a common and safe way of removing the obstruction.

Other tools may be used to remove food boluses. The Roth Net is a mesh net that can be inserted through the endoscope, and opened and closed from the outside; it can be used to retrieve pieces of obstructed food. Snares, which are normally used to remove polyps, can be used to macerate the food causing the obstruction. Dormia baskets, which are metal baskets used to remove stones from the common bile duct in a procedure known as endoscopic retrograde cholangiopancreatography, can be opened and closed from the outside in a similar manner to macerate food and facilitate removal. Forceps used for biopsies can also be employed in a similar manner.
