= Phagophobia =

Fear of swallowing

- Specialty: Psychology

Phagophobia is a psychogenic dysphagia, a fear of swallowing. It is expressed in various swallowing complaints without any apparent physical reason detectable by physical inspection and laboratory analyses. An obsolete term for this condition is choking phobia, but it was suggested that the latter term is confusing and it is necessary to distinguish the fear of swallowing (i.e., of the propulsion of bolus) from fear of choking.

Phagophobia is classified as a specific phobia, and (according to DSM-IV classification) it belongs to the category of "other phobias". Phagophobia may lead to (and be confused with) fear of eating, and the subsequent malnutrition and weight loss. In milder cases, a phagophobe eats only soft and liquid foods.

== See also ==
- Odynophagia
- Pseudodysphagia
- List of phobias
