= Autenrieth =

Autenrieth is a German surname. Notable people with the surname include:

- Charles M. Autenrieth (1828–1906), American architect
- Georg Autenrieth (1833–1900), German philologist
- Johann Heinrich Ferdinand von Autenrieth (1772–1835), German physician

== See also ==
- Bayford-Autenrieth dysphagia
- Karosseriebau Autenrieth, German coachbuilding company
