= Plummer–Vinson syndrome =

- Other names: Paterson–Kelly syndrome; Paterson–Brown-Kelly syndrome; Sideropenic dysphagia
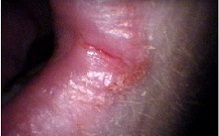
- Angular stomatitis
- Specialty: Gastroenterology, Hematology
- Symptoms: Dysphagia, iron-deficiency anemia, glossitis, cheilosis, esophageal webs
- Complications: Esophageal cancer, pharyngeal cancer
- Usual onset: Typically in perimenopausal women
- Duration: Chronic, but treatable
- Causes: Iron deficiency
- Risk factors: Poor nutritional status, particularly iron deficiency
- Diagnostic method: Clinical evaluation, esophagogastroduodenoscopy, blood tests (for iron deficiency)
- Prevention: Adequate iron intake, monitoring at-risk individuals
- Treatment: Iron supplementation, mechanical dilation of the esophagus
- Medication: Iron supplements
- Prognosis: Generally good with treatment
- Frequency: Rare

Plummer–Vinson syndrome (also known as Paterson–Kelly syndrome or Paterson–Brown-Kelly syndrome in the UK) is a rare disease characterized by dysphagia (difficulty swallowing), iron-deficiency anemia, atrophic glossitis (inflammation of the tongue), angular cheilitis or cheilosis (crackings at the corners of the mouth, respectively associated or not with inflammation), and upper esophageal webs (thin membranes in the esophagus that can cause obstruction). Treatment with iron supplementation and mechanical widening of the esophagus generally leads to positive outcomes.

While exact epidemiological data are lacking, the syndrome has become scarce due to the improved nutritional status of the at-risk population. The syndrome generally occurs in perimenopausal women. Identification and follow-up of affected individuals are important due to the increased risk of squamous cell carcinoma of the esophagus and pharynx.

== Presentation ==
Patients with Plummer–Vinson syndrome often experience a burning sensation in the tongue and oral mucosa, and atrophy of the lingual papillae results in a smooth, shiny, red dorsum of the tongue.

Common symptoms include:

- Dysphagia (difficulty swallowing) and, even, Odynophagia (painful swallowing);
- Pain;
- Weakness;
- Atrophic glossitis (smooth tongue);
- Angular cheilitis or cheilosis (crackings at the corners of the mouth, respectively associated or not with inflammation);
- Koilonychia (abnormally thin or spoon-shaped nails);
- Splenomegaly (enlarged spleen);
- Upper esophageal webs (located in the post-cricoid region, contrasting with Schatzki rings found at the lower end of the esophagus).

Serial contrast gastrointestinal radiography or upper-gastrointestinal endoscopy may reveal the presence of esophageal webs.

Blood tests typically show hypochromic microcytic anemia, consistent with iron-deficiency anemia. A biopsy of the affected tongue mucosa usually reveals epithelial atrophy (shrinking) and varying degrees of submucosal chronic inflammation. Epithelial atypia or dysplasia may also be present.

In some cases, the syndrome may manifest as post-cricoid malignancy, which can be detected by the absence of laryngeal crepitus. Normally, laryngeal crepitus is produced when the cricoid cartilage rubs against the vertebrae.

== Causes ==
The cause of Plummer–Vinson syndrome is unknown; however, both genetic factors and nutritional deficiencies may play a role. The syndrome is more common in women, particularly those in middle age, with a peak incidence occurring in individuals over 50 years of age.

== Diagnosis ==
The following clinical presentations may be indicative of Plummer–Vinson syndrome and may be used in its diagnosis:

1. Dizziness
2. Pallor of the conjunctiva and face
3. Erythematous oral mucosa with a burning sensation
4. Breathlessness
5. Atrophic, smooth tongue
6. Peripheral rhagades (cracks or fissures) around the oral cavity

The following tests are helpful in the diagnosis of Plummer–Vinson syndrome:

=== Lab tests ===
Complete blood cell counts, peripheral blood smears, and iron studies (e.g., serum iron, total iron-binding capacity, ferritin, and saturation percentage) are essential for confirming iron deficiency, with or without the presence of hypochromic microcytic anemia.

=== Imaging ===
Barium esophagography and videofluoroscopy can aid in detecting esophageal webs. Esophagogastroduodenoscopy allows for the visual confirmation of these webs, which are caused by subepithelial fibrosis.

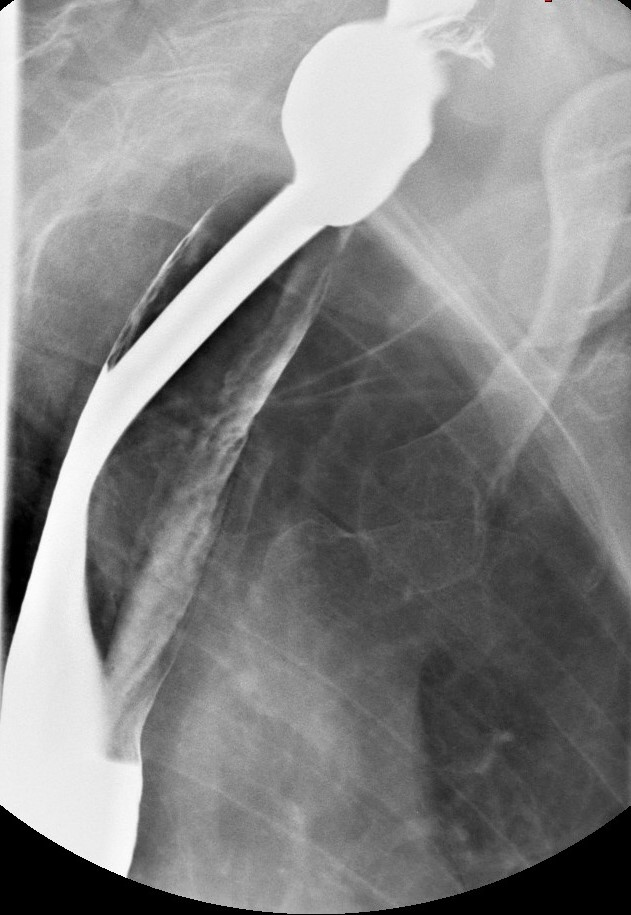
Upright double contrast image showing jet phenomena from cervical esophageal web.

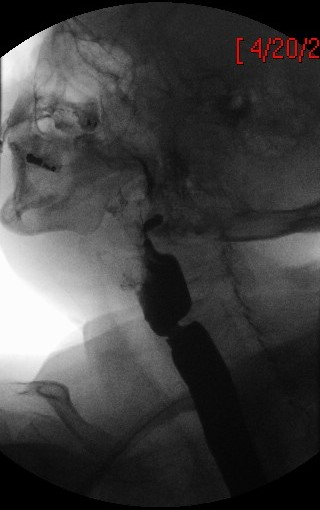
Right posterior oblique prone single contrast fluoroscopic image showing a circumferential thin cervical esophageal web.

== Prevention ==
Maintaining good nutrition with adequate iron intake may help prevent this disorder. A balanced diet, combined with regular exercise, is also recommended.

== Treatment ==
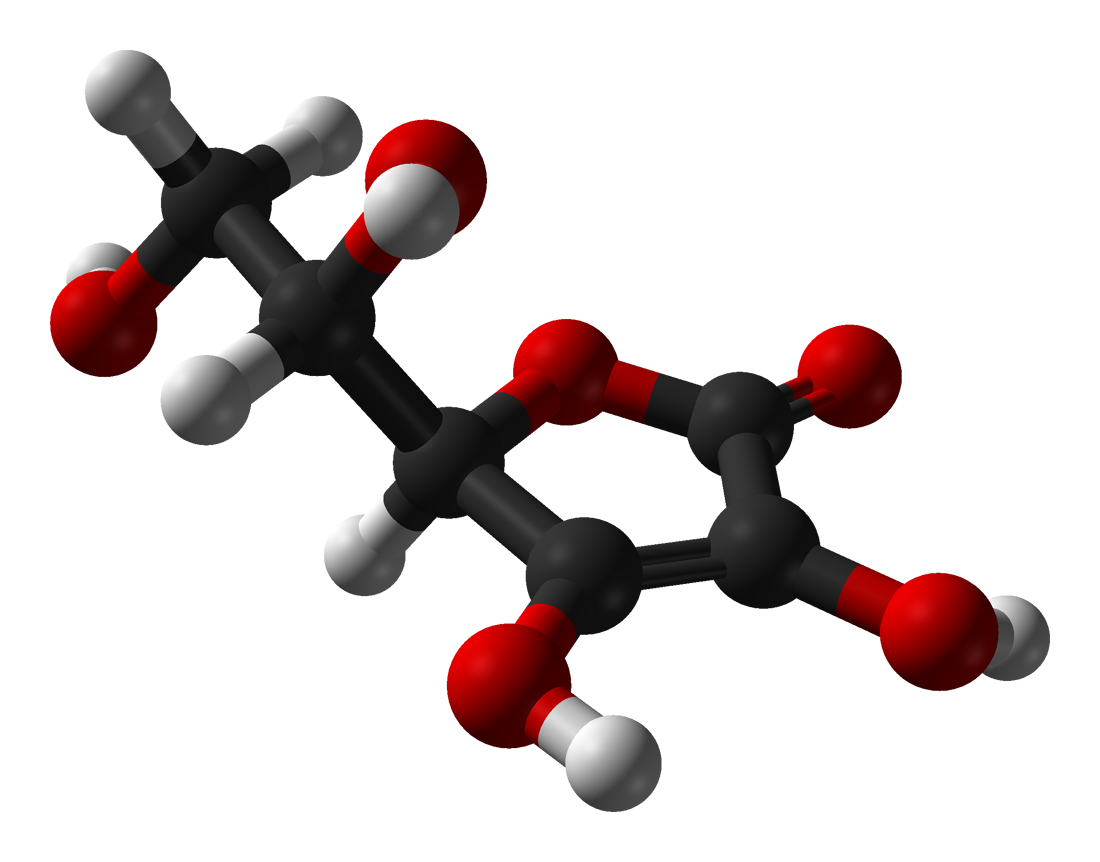
Ascorbic acid

Treatment for Plummer–Vinson syndrome primarily focuses on correcting the underlying iron-deficiency anemia. Patients should receive iron supplementation as part of their diet, which may alleviate symptoms such as dysphagia and pain. If symptoms persist, the esophageal web can be dilated using esophageal bougies during upper endoscopy, which allows for normal swallowing and the passage of food. However, there is a risk of perforation of the esophagus with the use of dilators for treatment.

== Prognosis ==
Patients generally respond well to treatment. Iron supplementation usually resolves the anemia and corrects the glossodynia (tongue pain). Plummer–Vinson syndrome is recognized as a risk factor for developing squamous cell carcinoma of the oral cavity, esophagus, and hypopharynx. The risk of esophageal squamous cell carcinoma is also increased, and therefore, the syndrome is considered a premalignant condition.

== Epidemiology ==
Plummer–Vinson syndrome (PVS) is an extremely rare condition, and its exact prevalence remains unknown. While it is becoming less common in developed countries, the condition is increasingly found in developing regions, particularly in Asia. However, it is very rarely observed in African countries, despite the relatively high prevalence of iron deficiency there.

== History ==
The disease is named after two Americans working at the Mayo Clinic—physician Henry Stanley Plummer and surgeon Porter Paisley Vinson. In the UK, it is known as Paterson–Kelly or Paterson–Brown-Kelly syndrome, named after Derek Brown-Kelly and Donald Ross Paterson, who independently described the syndrome in 1919. Despite this, "Plummer–Vinson syndrome" remains the most commonly used name.

== See also ==
- List of hematologic conditions
