= Presbyphagia =

Age-related changes in swallowing

Presbyphagia refers to characteristic changes in the swallowing mechanism of otherwise healthy older adults. Although age-related changes place older adults at risk swallowing disorders, an older adult's swallow is not necessarily an impaired swallow. Clinicians are becoming more aware of the need to distinguish among swallowing disorders, presbyphagia (an old yet healthy swallow) and other related diagnoses in order to avoid over diagnosing and over treating presbyphagia. Older adults are more vulnerable and with the increased threat of acute illnesses, medications and any number of age-related conditions, they can cross the line from having a healthy older swallow to being dysphagic.

Work focused primarily on the anatomy and physiology of the oropharyngeal swallowing mechanism indicates a progression of change that may put the older population at increased risk for swallowing disorders. Such changes combined with naturally diminished functional reserve, the resilient ability to adapt to physiological stress, make the older population more susceptible to dysphagia.

== Age-Associated Changes in Swallowing ==
=== Age-Associated Changes in Oropharyngeal Swallowing ===
A major characteristic of older healthy swallowing is that it occurs more slowly. The longer duration is found to occur largely before the more automatic pharyngeal phase of the swallow is initiated. In those over age 65, the initiation of laryngeal and pharyngeal events, including laryngeal vestibule closure, are delayed significantly longer than in adults younger than 45 years of age. Although the specific neural underpinning is not confirmed it might be hypothesized that oral events become “uncoupled” from the pharyngeal response, which includes airway protection. Thus, in older healthy adults it is not uncommon for the bolus to be adjacent to an open airway by pooling or pocketing in the pharyngeal recesses, for more time than in younger adults.

Whereas older adults demonstrate a delay in the onset of specific pharyngeal events, such as opening of the upper esophageal sphincter (UES) to permit bolus passage from the pharynx into the esophagus, an equally critical finding is that the range of UES opening is diminished. A scintigraphic study revealed increased pharyngeal residue with age, possibly related to the limited UES opening. Again, these findings indicate exposure of an open airway to material retained in the pharynx, increasing the risk for aspiration in older individuals.

Aspiration (defined as entry of material into the airway [trachea] thus passing below the vocal folds) and airway penetration (defined as entry of material into the laryngeal vestibule but not below the level of the vocal folds) (Figure 2) are believed to be the most significant adverse clinical outcomes of misdirected bolus flow. In older adults, penetration of the bolus into the airway occurs more often and to a deeper and more severe level than in younger adults. When the swallowing mechanism is functionally altered or perturbed in older people, such as with the placement of a nasogastric tube, airway penetration can be even more pronounced. A study examining this issue found that liquid penetrated the airway significantly more frequently when a nasogastric tube was in place in men and women older than 70 years. That study and additional evidence indicates that under stressful conditions or system perturbations, older individuals are less able to compensate due to the age-related reduction in reserve capacity (add Pendergast reference) and are more at risk to experience airway penetration or aspiration.

=== Age-related Change in Lingual Pressure Generation ===
The tongue is the primary propulsive agent for pumping food through the mouth, into the pharynx while bypassing the airway and through to the esophagus. Recent findings clearly reveal that an age-related change in lingual pressures is another contributing factor to presbyphagia. Healthy older individuals demonstrate significantly reduced isometric (i.e., static) tongue pressures compared with younger counterparts. In contrast, maximal tongue pressures generated during swallowing (i.e., dynamic) remain normal in magnitude. because, fortunately, swallowing is a submaximal pressure-demanding activity. In general, swallowing is considered a submaximal pressure task such that peak tongue pressures used in swallowing are lower than those generated isometrically. Although older individuals manage to achieve pressures necessary to effect a successful swallow, despite a reduction in overall maximum tongue strength, they achieve these pressures more slowly than young swallowers. It has been suggested that the slowness that characterizes senescent swallowing may reflect the increased time necessary to recruit sufficient motor units to generate pressures necessary to operate an effective, safe swallow.

== See also ==
- Dysphagia
- Swallowing
