= Henry Stanley Plummer =

American physician (1874–1936)

Henry Stanley Plummer MD, FACP
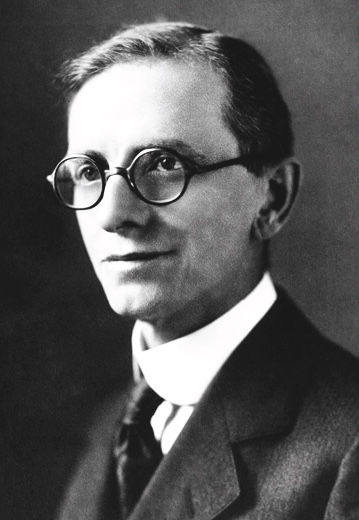
- Born: March 3, 1874; Hamilton, Minnesota, US
- Died: December 31, 1936 (aged 62); Rochester, Minnesota, US
- Education: University of Minnesota (BS), Northwestern University (MD)
- Years active: 1901–1936
- Known for: The Plummer Building
- Spouse: Daisy Mae Berkman (m. 1904)
- Relatives: Albert Plummer (father)
- Medical career
- Field: Internal medicine, Endocrinology
- Institutions: Mayo Clinic
- Research: Hyperthyroidism

Henry Stanley Plummer (March 3, 1874 – December 31, 1936) was an American internist and endocrinologist. He, along with William Mayo, Charles Mayo, Augustus Stinchfield, E. Starr Judd, Christopher Graham, and Donald Balfour founded Mayo Clinic. Plummer is honored by the Plummer Building, which still stands as a part of the Clinic he helped establish.

== Biography ==
=== Early life and education ===
Plummer was born in 1874 in Hamilton, Minnesota to Albert Plummer (August 9, 1840 – March 20, 1912) and his wife Isabelle Plummer (née Steere; September 26, 1850 – January 15, 1936). He went to high school in Spring Valley, Minnesota, after which he attended the University of Minnesota for two years and went on to complete his course of study with a four-year term at the Chicago Medical College of Northwestern University, graduating in 1898. He returned to Racine, Minnesota, after schooling, to assist his father with his private medical practice.

=== Career ===
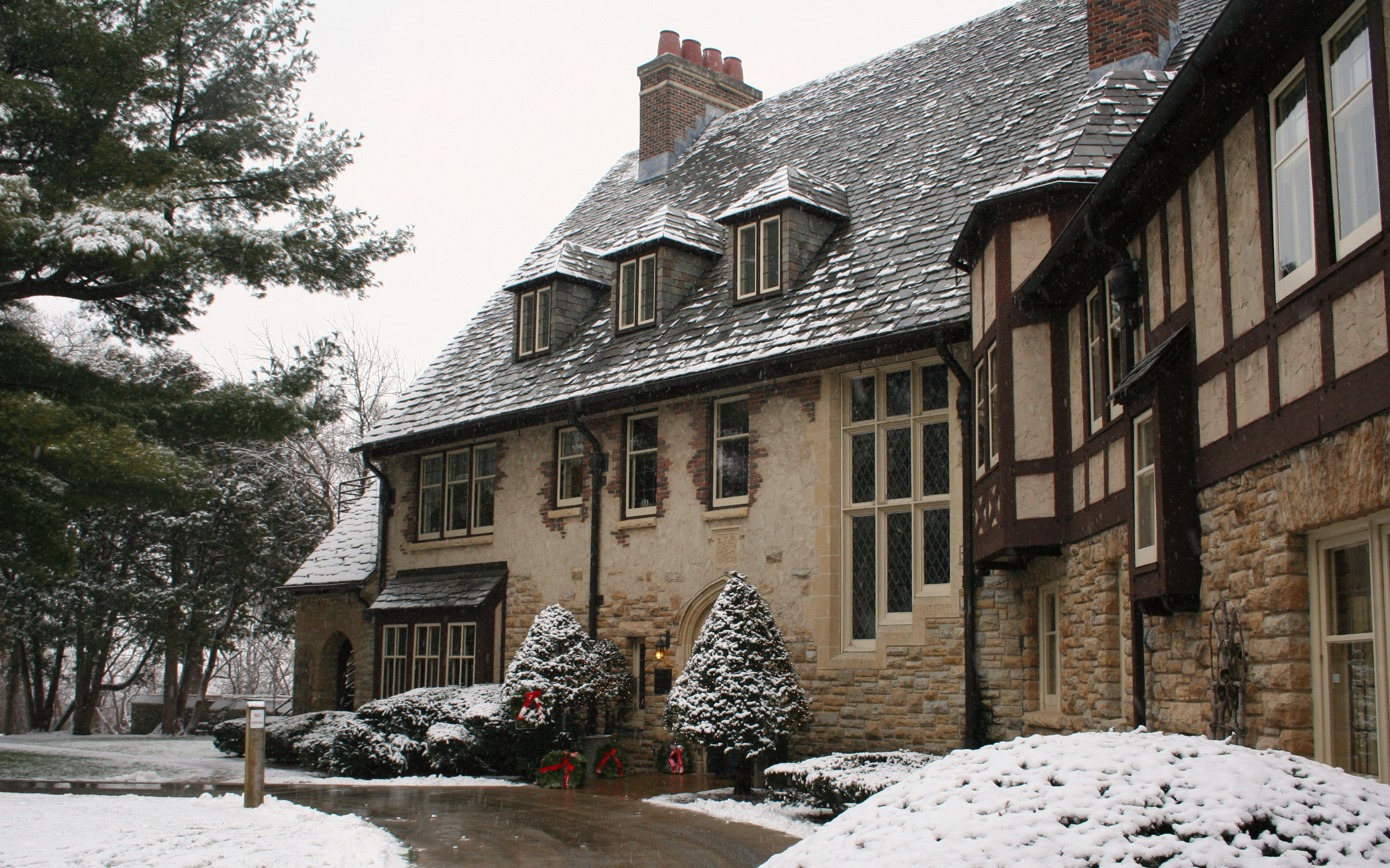
The Plummer House

Plummer became a partner in the Mayo Clinic's practice in 1901, and William Mayo would later quip that hiring Plummer was the "best day's work he had ever done".

Plummer's work in internal medicine and endocrinology led to several important advances in the specialty. Such advances included identifying disorders, outlining diagnostic indications, and developing treatments. Plummer was crucial to the identification and description of Plummer-Vinson syndrome, Plummer's nail, Plummer's disease (the second-most common cause of hyperthyroidism after Graves' disease), and Plummer's sign (used for the diagnosis of Graves' disease). He also promoted treating goiters with iodine.

In 1917, construction began on the Plummer House, the English Tudor mansion where Plummer and his family lived. The house was designed by Ellerbe & Round and boasted many innovations that were rare at the time. Daisy Plummer gave the furnished house and property to the Rochester Art Center in 1971. Her wish was that the house and grounds would be used by the people of Rochester and Clinic guests as a center for the arts. The house was later transferred to the Rochester Park and Recreation Department and is now used as a museum and a rental facility for special events.

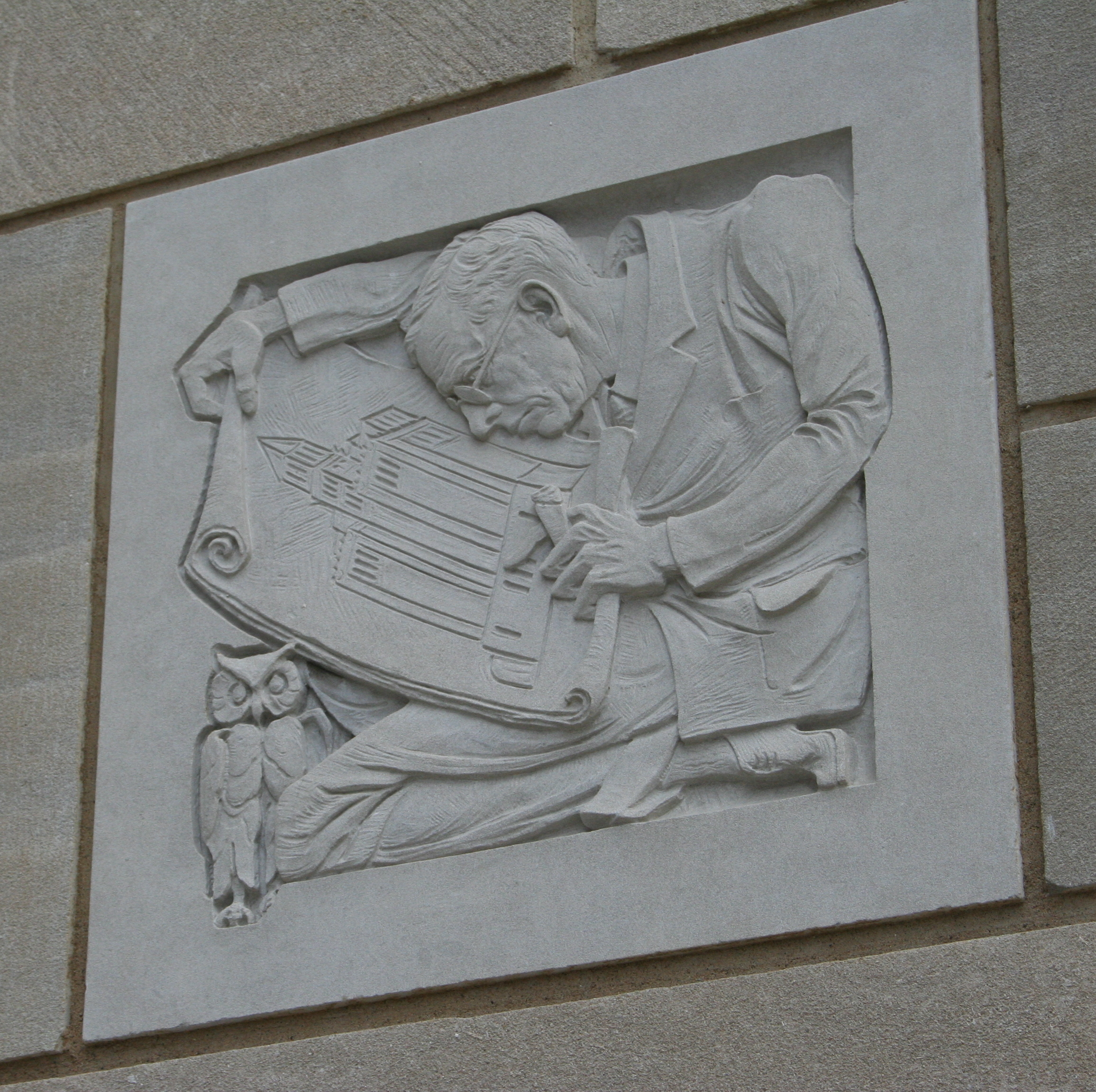
Architectural detail representing Plummer on the Plummer Building

Plummer was also a successful scientist and inventor; Plummer invented the modern "dossier" system - a system he thought superior to the traditional 'pen & paper' - that assigns each medical patient an ID and stores all that patient's information in a single folder chronologically. He, along with Frederick Maass of Maass & McAndrew, developed many highly innovative systems in the 1914 and 1927 Clinic buildings. Under the guidance of Plummer, the 1914 building allowed the integrated group medical practice concept to be fully expressed. Many highly innovative medical systems, tools, and equipment were incorporated into the building's design. This was groundbreaking work, and the first building designed to facilitate the integrated group medical practice. Plummer worked closely with Frederic Maass, of Maass & McAndrew, to design and fabricate many of the building systems innovations, like the steam sterilization rooms, metal surgical tools and equipment, the pneumatic tube system, knee operated sinks, and a state of the art HVAC system. The air exchange rate for the building was three minutes. One intriguing innovation was the Rookwood fountain in the main lobby that was designed to clean and humidify air from the outside. It also heated and humidified the air in the winter, and provided cool air in the summer. To fight infection, steam sterilizer rooms were designed to hold much of the operating room's metal surgical furniture, tools and equipment. These and other aseptic procedures helped bring the overall patient infection rates down - which in turn helped grow the Mayo Clinic practice, along with its well-earned reputation for innovation, into what it is today. In 1928, the Plummer Building was completed with considerable input from Clinic staff, and again under the guidance of Plummer. Maass again worked closely with Plummer and staff on system design. After this project was complete, Plummer was hired as the "Chief Engineer" for the Clinic. Working hand in hand with physicians, scientists, and other Mayo Clinic staff, the engineering department developed unique medical devices and systems, many designed to meet the needs of individual patients.

He also directed the development of Mayo's clinical laboratories, as well as bringing in Louis B. Wilson in 1907 to develop and manage the diagnostic and research labs and was the first to utilize X-ray machines as a diagnostic tool at the Clinic. Will Mayo called Plummer "a pioneer in the development of X-ray diagnosis and therapy". But perhaps one of his greatest contributions to medicine was the development and implementation of the integrated private medical group practice.

Plummer is considered by many to be the "architect of the modern medical practice." His innovative contributions to medical systems and building designs, as well as his early understanding of the importance of the diagnostic and research aspects of the clinical practice, allowed for the creation of the integrated group practice, as well as medical specialization.

=== Death ===
Plummer died in Rochester, Minnesota on December 31, 1936, at age 62.

== Legacy ==
Plummer was known to many as a diversified genius.

The Plummer–Vinson syndrome is named after him and Porter Paisley Vinson. Plummer's nail refers to the separation of the nail from the nailbed which occurs in thyrotoxicosis and psoriatic arthritis. The Plummer effect is an intrathyroidal feed-forward mechanism preventing thyrotoxicosis in situations of high iodine load.

== Personal life ==
His wife, the former Daisy Berkman, was the niece of the Mayo Brothers; they had two adopted children, Robert and Gertrude. Henry Plummer's younger brother, William Albert Plummer, was also a prominent Mayo physician. The two Plummer brothers represented the next generation of medical practitioner and helped usher in the modern medical age with innovations such as the integrated group practice and specialization.
