= Fear of eating =

A fear of eating is associated with:

- Fear of eating in public, a specific social phobia
- Anorexia nervosa, an eating disorder in which people avoid eating due to concerns about body weight or body image
- Avoidant/restrictive food intake disorder, an eating disorder in which people avoid eating or eat only a very narrow range of foods
- Phagophobia, a fear of swallowing
- Pseudodysphagia, an irrational fear of swallowing
