= Johann Heinrich Ferdinand von Autenrieth =

German physician (1772–1835)

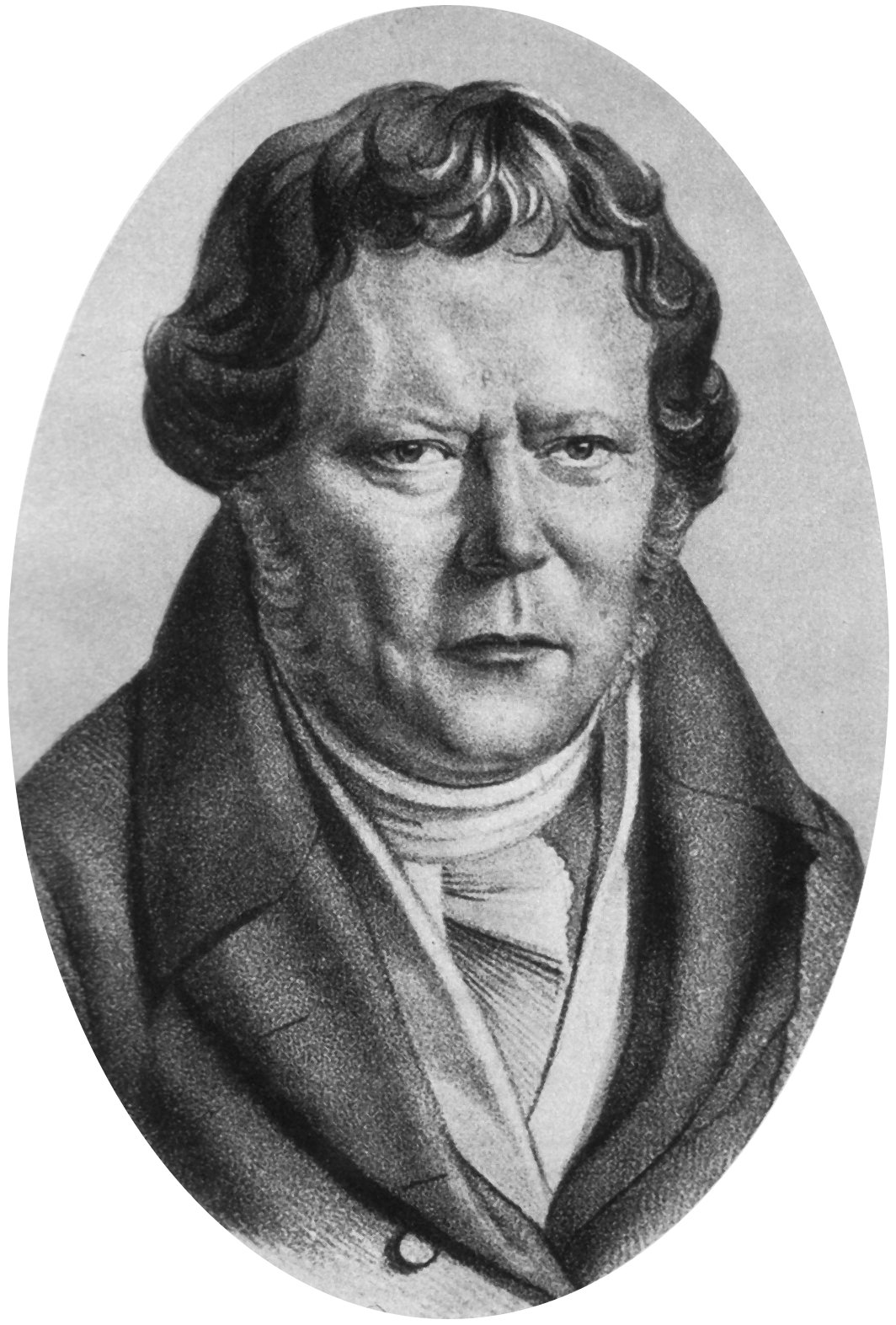

Johann Heinrich Ferdinand von Autenrieth (20 October 1772 – 2 May 1835) was a German medical doctor.

Born in Stuttgart, on 20 October 1772, he studied medicine at Karlsschule Stuttgart, and following graduation attended lectures by Antonio Scarpa (1752–1832) and Johann Peter Frank (1745–1821) at Pavia. Afterwards he accompanied his father to the United States, where he practiced medicine for several months in Lancaster, Pennsylvania. In 1797, he was appointed professor of anatomy, physiology, surgery and obstetrics at the University of Tübingen. In 1805, he founded an in-patient clinic at Tübingen, where in 1822 he was appointed chancellor of the university.

Autenrieth specialized in forensic medicine, and was considered one of the top clinical physicians during the early part of the 19th century. One of his better written efforts was an 1806 treatise on forensics titled "Anleitung für gerichtliche Ärzte und Wundärzte".

He died in Tübingen, on 2 Mar 1835.

== Associated eponym ==
- "Bayford-Autenrieth dysphagia": Dysphagia lusoria with compression of the esophagus by an aberrant right subclavian artery. Named with English surgeon David Bayford.
