= Eosinophilic esophagitis =

Allergic inflammatory condition of the esophagus

- Other names: Allergic oesophagitis
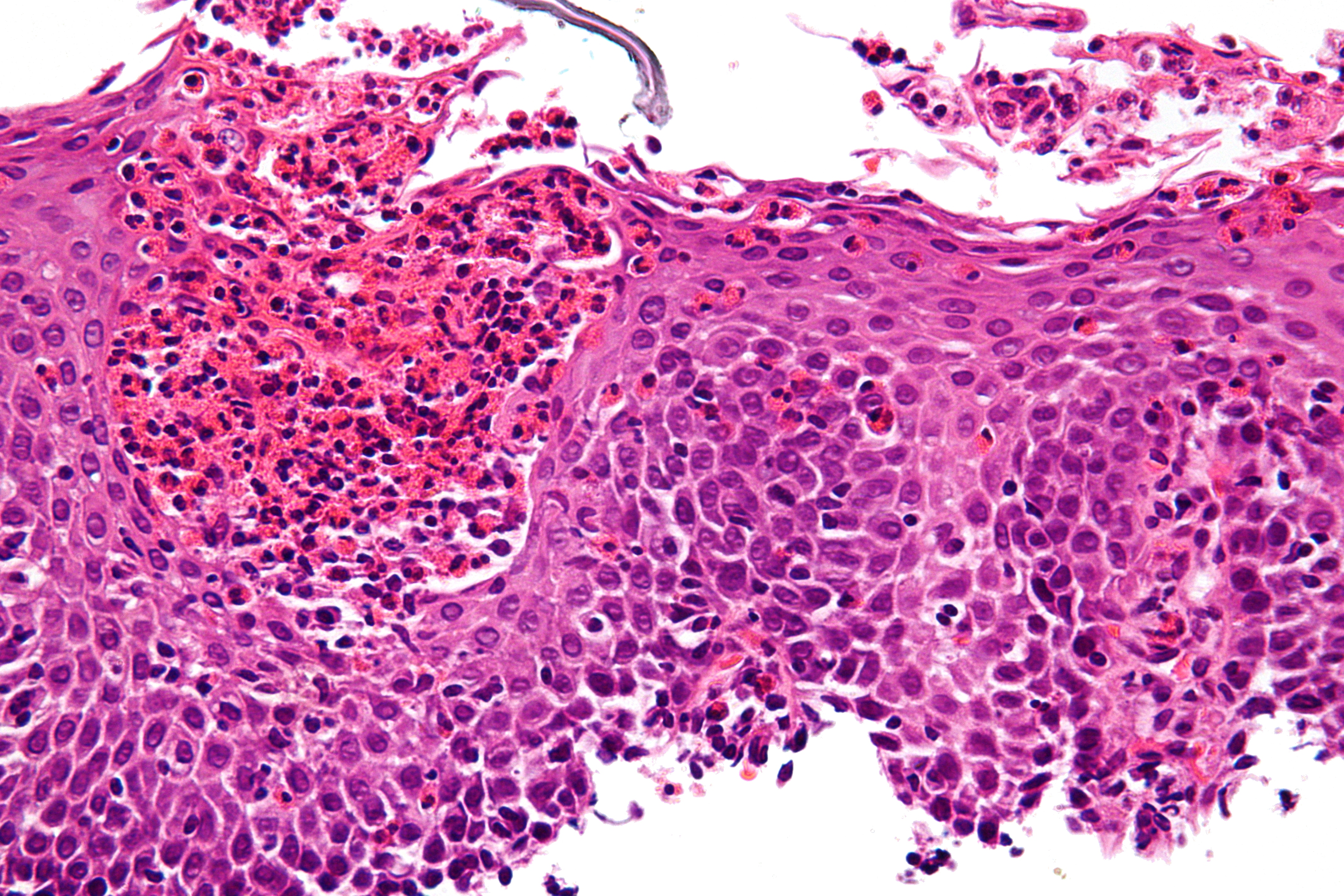
- Micrograph showing eosinophilic esophagitis. H&E stain.
- Specialty: Immunology, Gastroenterology
- Differential diagnosis: GERD, infection, celiac disease, hypereosinophilic syndrome, Crohn's disease, eosinophilic granulomatosis with polyangiitis

Eosinophilic esophagitis (EoE) is an allergic inflammatory condition of the esophagus that involves eosinophils, a type of white blood cell. In healthy individuals, the esophagus is typically devoid of eosinophils. In EoE, eosinophils migrate to the esophagus in large numbers. When a trigger food is eaten, the eosinophils contribute to tissue damage and inflammation. Symptoms include swallowing difficulty, food impaction, vomiting, and heartburn.

Eosinophilic esophagitis was first described in children, but it also occurs in adults. The condition is poorly understood, but food allergy may play a significant role. The treatment may consist of removing known or suspected triggers and medication to suppress the immune response. In severe cases, it may be necessary to enlarge the esophagus with an endoscopy procedure.

While knowledge about EoE has been increasing rapidly, diagnosing it can be challenging because the symptoms and histopathologic findings are not specific.

== Signs and symptoms ==
EoE often presents with difficulty swallowing, food impaction, stomach pains, regurgitation or vomiting, and decreased appetite. Although the typical onset of EoE is in childhood, the disease can be found in all age groups, and symptoms vary depending on the age of presentation. In addition, young children with EoE may present with feeding difficulties and poor weight gain. It is more common in males and affects both adults and children.

Predominant symptoms in school-aged children and adolescents include difficulty swallowing, food impaction, and choking/gagging with meals- particularly when eating foods with coarse textures. Other symptoms in this age group can include abdominal/chest pain, vomiting, and regurgitation. The predominant symptom in adults is difficulty swallowing; however, intractable heartburn and food avoidance may also be present. Due to the long-standing inflammation and possible resultant scarring that may have gone unrecognized, adults presenting with EoE tend to have more episodes of esophageal food impaction as well as other esophageal abnormalities such as Schatzki ring, esophageal webs, and in some cases, achalasia.

Although many of these symptoms overlap with the symptoms of GERD, the majority of patients with EoE exhibit a poor response to acid-suppression therapy. Many people with EoE have other autoimmune and allergic diseases such as asthma and celiac disease. Mast cell disorders such as mast cell activation syndrome or mastocytosis are also frequently associated with it.

== Pathophysiology ==
The pathophysiology of eosinophilic esophagitis is incompletely understood. Still, it is thought to involve some type of antigen exposure (coupled with a pre-existing genetic susceptibility), which causes a hyperactive immune response from immune cells in the esophagus. The antigenic exposure is thought to stimulate the esophageal epithelial cells to release the inflammatory cytokines IL-33 and thymic stromal lymphopoietin, which attract and activate Th2 helper T-cells. These helper T-cells the release pro-inflammatory cytokines including IL-13, IL-4 and IL-5. These inflammatory cytokines, coupled with the T-cell response cause inflammation in the esophagus as well as stimulate basal cell hyperplasia and dilated intracellular spaces of the esophageal cells, characteristic histologic changes of the disease. The IL-5 released by the helper T-cells and eotaxin-3 act as chemotaxins, attracting granulocytes to the esophagus, including basophils, mast cells, and eosinophils, with the eosinophilic infiltration giving the disease its characteristic histological changes.

Eosinophils are inflammatory cells that release a variety of chemical signals which inflame the surrounding esophageal tissue. This results in the signs and symptoms of pain, visible redness on endoscopy, and a natural history that may include stricturing. Eosinophils are normally present in other parts of a healthy gastrointestinal tract; these white blood cells are not normally found in the esophagus of a healthy individual. The reason for the migration of eosinophils to the tissue of the esophagus is not fully understood but is being studied extensively. The migration of eosinophils to the esophagus may be due to genetic, environmental, and host immune system factors.

At a tissue level, EoE is characterized by a dense infiltrate with white blood cells of the eosinophil type into the epithelial lining of the esophagus. This is considered an allergic reaction against ingested food, based on eosinophils' important role in allergic reactions. The eosinophils are recruited into the tissue in response to the local production of eotaxin-3 by IL-13-stimulated esophageal epithelial cells.

== Diagnosis ==
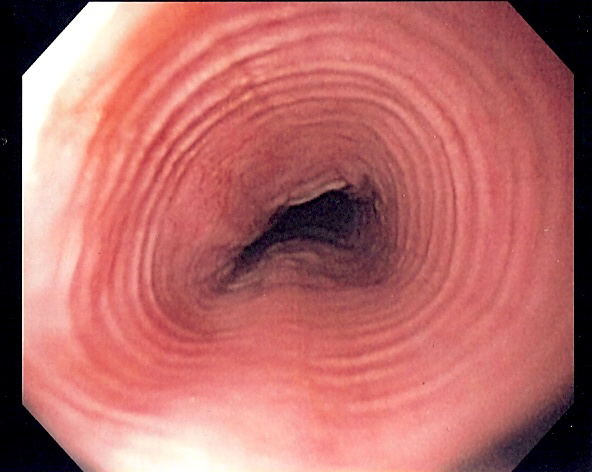
Endoscopic image of esophagus in a case of eosinophilic esophagitis. Concentric rings are termed trachealization of the esophagus.

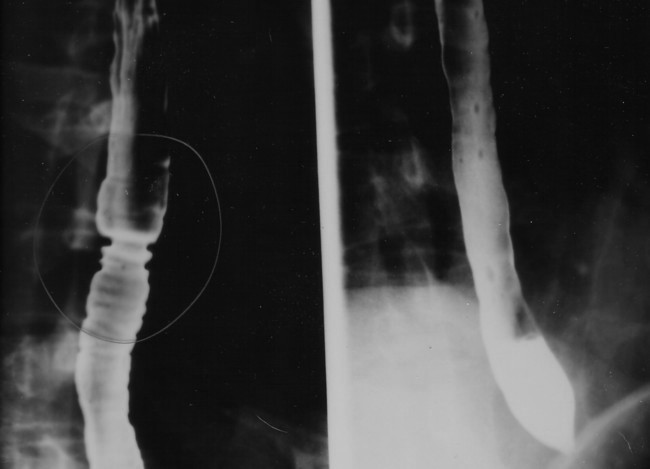
The barium swallow of the esophagus on the left side shows multiple rings associated with eosinophilic esophagitis.

The diagnosis of EoE is typically made based on the combination of symptoms and findings from diagnostic testing. To properly diagnose EoE, various diseases such as GERD, esophageal cancer, achalasia, hypereosinophilic syndrome, infection, Crohn's disease, and drug allergies need to be ruled out.

Prior to the development of the EE Diagnostic Panel, EoE could only be diagnosed if gastroesophageal reflux did not respond to a six-week trial of twice-a-day high-dose proton-pump inhibitors (PPIs) or if a negative ambulatory pH study ruled out gastroesophageal reflux disease (GERD).

Radiologically, the term "ringed esophagus" has been used for the appearance of eosinophilic esophagitis on barium swallow studies to contrast with the appearance of transient transverse folds sometimes seen with esophageal reflux (termed "feline esophagus").

=== Endoscopy ===
Endoscopically, ridges, furrows, or rings may be seen in the esophageal wall. Sometimes, multiple rings may occur in the esophagus, leading to the term "corrugated esophagus" or "feline esophagus" due to the similarity of the rings to the cat esophagus. The presence of white exudates in the esophagus also suggests the diagnosis. On biopsy taken at the time of endoscopy, numerous eosinophils can be seen in the superficial epithelium. A minimum of 15 eosinophils per high-power field is required to make the diagnosis. Eosinophilic inflammation is not limited to the esophagus alone and does extend through the whole gastrointestinal tract. Profoundly degranulated eosinophils may also be present, as may microabscesses and an expansion of the basal layer.

Although endoscopic findings help identify patients with EoE, they are not diagnostic if the patient has no clinical symptoms.

=== Esophageal mucosal biopsy ===
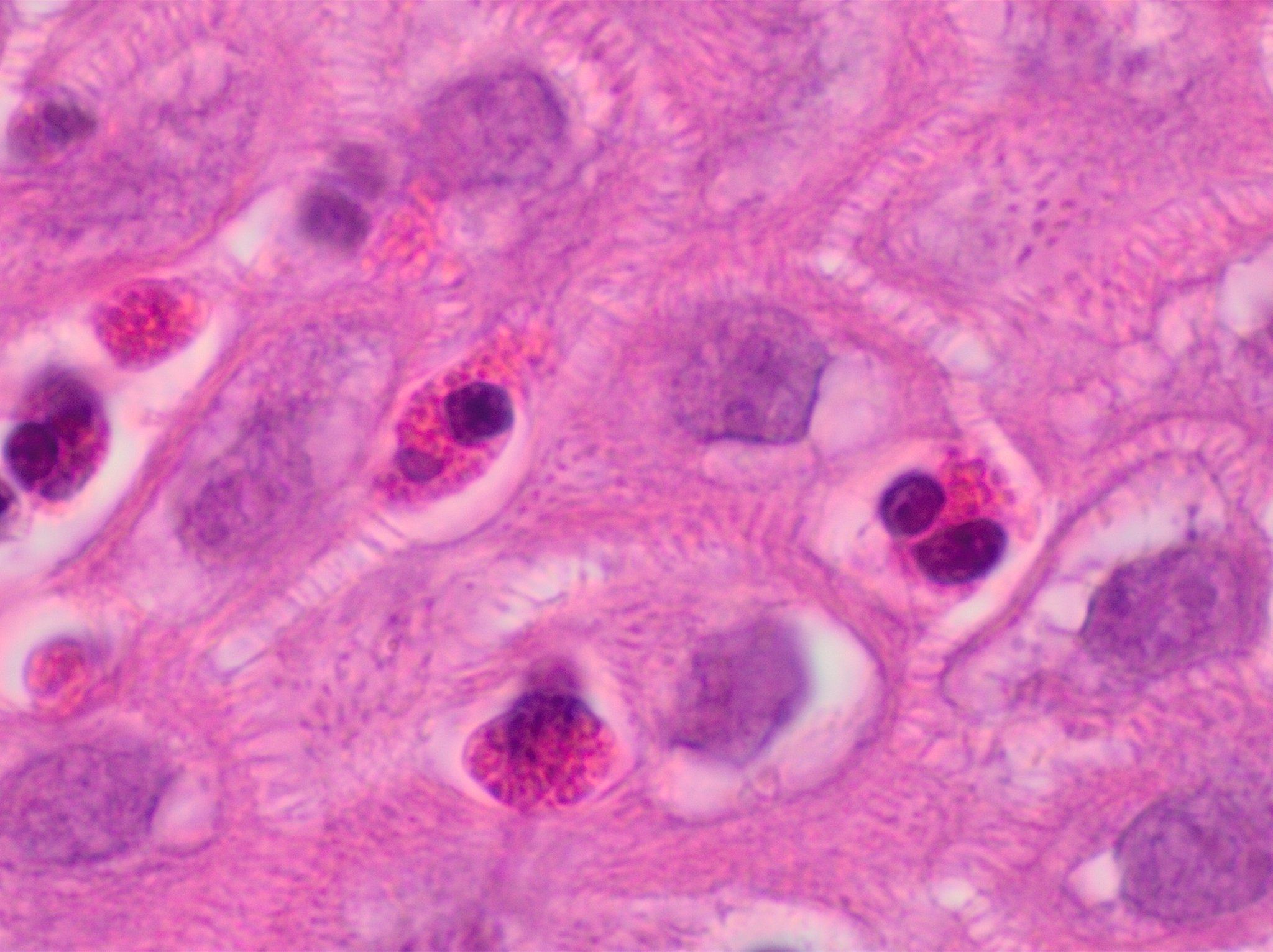
Histopathology of eosinophilic esophagitis, showing multiple intraepithelial eosinophils (bilobed cells with reddish cytoplasm on H&E stain), and edema seen as white clearings.

Endoscopic mucosal biopsy remains the gold standard diagnostic test for EoE and is required to confirm the diagnosis. Endoscopy with biopsies of the esophagus has a 100% sensitivity and 96% specificity for diagnosing eosinophilic esophagitis. Biopsy specimens from both the proximal/mid and distal esophagus should be obtained regardless of the gross appearance of the mucosa. Specimens should also be obtained from areas revealing endoscopic abnormalities. 2–4 biopsies should be obtained from both the proximal and distal esophagus to obtain adequate tissue samples for the detection of EoE. A definitive diagnosis of EoE is based on the presence of at least 15 eosinophils/HPF in the esophageal biopsies of patients with exclusion of other causes of eosinophilia in the esophagus including gastroesophageal reflux disease (GERD), achalasia hypereosinophilic syndrome, Crohn's disease, infections, pill esophagitis, or graft vs host disease. Endoscopy is also indicated after treatment is started to confirm histologic remission.

=== Allergy assessment ===
A thorough personal and family history of other atopic conditions is recommended in all patients with EoE. Testing for allergic sensitization may be considered using skin prick testing or blood testing for allergen-specific IgE. This is particularly important for the 10–20% of EoE patients with immediate IgE-mediated food allergy symptoms. Atopy patch testing has been used in some cases for the potential identification of delayed, non-IgE (cell-mediated) reactions.

=== Diagnostic criteria ===
The diagnosis of eosinophilic esophagitis requires all of the following:

- Symptoms related to esophageal dysfunction.
- Eosinophil-predominant inflammation on esophageal biopsy, characteristically consisting of a peak value of ≥15 eosinophils per high-power field (HPF).
- Exclusion of other causes that may be responsible for symptoms and esophageal eosinophilia.

== Treatment ==
EoE treatment aims to control the symptoms by decreasing the number of eosinophils in the esophagus and, subsequently, reducing esophageal inflammation. Management consists of dietary, pharmacological, and endoscopic treatment.

=== Dietary management ===
Dietary treatment can be effective, as allergies appear to play a role in developing EOE. Allergy testing is ineffective in predicting which foods drive the disease process. If no specific allergenic food or agent is present, a trial of the six-food elimination diet (SFED) can be pursued. Various approaches have been tried, where either six food groups (cow's milk, wheat, egg, soy, nuts, and fish/seafood), four groups (animal milk, gluten-containing cereals, egg, legumes), or two groups (animal milk and gluten-containing cereals) are excluded for a while, usually six weeks. A "top-down" (starting with six foods, then reintroducing) approach may be very restrictive. Four- or even two-group exclusion diets may be less difficult to follow and reduce the need for many endoscopies if the response to the limited restriction is good.

Alternative options to SFED include the elemental diet, which is an amino acid-based diet. The elemental diet demonstrates a high rate of response (almost 90% in children, 70% in adults), with a rapid relief of symptoms associated with histological remission. This diet involves using amino acid-based liquid formulas for 4–6 weeks, followed by the histological evaluation of response. If remission is achieved, foods are slowly reintroduced.

=== Pharmacologic treatment ===
In patients diagnosed with EoE, a trial of proton-pump inhibitors (PPI), such as esomeprazole 20 mg to 40 mg oral daily or twice daily as a first-line therapy, is a reasonable option. In those who respond to PPI therapy with symptomatic improvement, endoscopy with esophageal biopsy should be repeated. If no eosinophils are present in the repeat biopsy, the diagnosis is either acid-mediated GERD with eosinophilia or non-GERD PPI-responsive EoE with an unknown mechanism. If both symptoms and eosinophils persist after treatment with PPI, the diagnosis is immune-mediated EoE.

Medical therapy for immune-mediated EoE primarily involves using corticosteroids. Systemic (oral) corticosteroids were one of the first treatment options shown to be effective in patients with EoE. Both clinical and histologic improvement have been noted in approximately 95% of EoE patients using systemic corticosteroids. However, upon discontinuation of therapy, 90% of patients using corticosteroids experience a recurrence of symptoms. In May 2022, U.S. Food and Drug Administration approved dupilumab (Dupixent) to treat eosinophilic esophagitis (EoE) in adults and pediatric patients 12 years and older weighing at least 40 kilograms (which is about 88 pounds) making it the first US FDA approved treatment for EoE.

=== Endoscopic dilatation ===
Flexible upper endoscopy is recommended to remove impacted food in patients with food impaction. Dilation is deferred in EoE until patients are adequately treated with pharmacological or dietary therapy, and the result of a response to therapy is available. The goals of therapy for treating EoE are to improve the patient's symptoms and reduce the number of eosinophils on biopsy. This procedure is effective in 84% of people who require it.

Esophageal strictures and rings can be safely dilated in EoE. A graduated balloon catheter is recommended for gradual dilation. The patient should be informed that after dilation, they might experience chest pain and, in addition, the risk of esophageal perforation and bleeding.

== Prognosis ==
The long-term prognosis for patients with EoE is unknown. Some patients may follow a "waxing and waning" course characterized by symptomatic episodes followed by periods of remission. There have also been reports of apparent spontaneous disease remission in some patients; however, the risk of recurrence in these patients is unknown. Long-standing, untreated disease may result in esophageal remodeling, leading to strictures, Schatzki ring and, eventually, achalasia. The risk of esophageal strictures increases the longer eosinophilic esophagitis goes untreated, with a 9% increased incidence of strictures each year.

== Risk factors ==
Many environmental factors can increase the risk of developing EoE, along with genetic factors that contribute to the disorder. The prevalence of EoE seems to be trending. There are many ongoing studies to try to find out why this may be the case. Risk factors for EoE include autoimmune conditions such as, inflammatory bowel disease and rheumatoid arthritis. Those with celiac disease, another autoimmune condition, are at higher risk of developing EoE as well. Individuals living in dry or cold climates as well as those living in areas of low population density are associated with higher rates of EoE. Food allergens are a risk factor of EoE and can often be directly attributed to the disease. Often, removing these food allergens from the diet can resolve EoE symptoms.

== Epidemiology ==
The prevalence of eosinophilic esophagitis has increased over time and currently ranges from 1 to 6 per 10,000 persons. Gender and ethnic variations exist in the prevalence of EoE, with most cases reported in Caucasian males.

In addition to gender (male predominance) and race (mainly a disease of Caucasian individuals), established risk factors for EoE include atopy and other allergic conditions. Other recognized genetic and environmental risk factors for EoE include alterations in gut barrier function (e.g., GERD), variation in the nature and timing of oral antigen exposure, lack of early exposure to microbes, and an altered microbiome. A study comparing active EoE children to non-EoE children found an altered microbiome due to a positive correlation between a relatively high abundance of Haemophilus and disease activity seen through an increasing Eosinophilic Esophagitis Endoscopic Reference Score and Eosinophilic Esophagitis Histologic Scoring System (q value = 5e-10). Measuring the relative abundance of specific taxa in children's salivary microbiome could serve as a noninvasive marker for eosinophilic esophagitis.

== History ==
The first case of eosinophilic esophagitis was reported in 1978. In the early 1990s, it became recognized as a distinct disease.

== See also ==
- Eosinophilic gastroenteritis
