= Dysphagia =

Difficulty in swallowing

- The digestive tract, with the esophagus marked in red
- Specialty: Gastroenterology, phoniatrics
- Symptoms: Inability or difficulty swallowing
- Complications: Pulmonary aspiration, malnutrition, starvation, anorexia nervosa
- Causes: Esophageal cancer, esophagitis, stomach cancer, mental illness, alcoholism, refeeding syndrome, starvation, infection, gastritis, malnutrition

Dysphagia is difficulty in swallowing. Although classified under "symptoms and signs" in ICD-10, in some contexts it is classified as a condition in its own right.

It may be a sensation that suggests difficulty in the passage of solids or liquids from the mouth to the stomach, a lack of pharyngeal sensation, or various other inadequacies of the swallowing mechanism. Dysphagia is distinguished from other symptoms including odynophagia, which is defined as painful swallowing, and globus, which is the sensation of a lump in the throat. A person can have dysphagia without odynophagia (dysfunction without pain), odynophagia without dysphagia (pain without dysfunction) or both together. A psychogenic dysphagia is known as phagophobia.

== Classification ==
Dysphagia is classified into the following major types:

1. Oropharyngeal dysphagia
2. Esophageal and obstructive dysphagia
3. Neuromuscular symptom complexes
4. Functional dysphagia is defined in some patients as having no organic cause for dysphagia that can be found.

== Signs and symptoms ==
Some patients have limited awareness of their dysphagia, so the lack of the symptom does not exclude an underlying disease. When dysphagia goes undiagnosed or untreated, patients are at a high risk of pulmonary aspiration and subsequent aspiration pneumonia secondary to food or liquids going the wrong way into the lungs. Some people present with "silent aspiration" and do not cough or show outward signs of aspiration. Undiagnosed dysphagia can also result in dehydration, malnutrition, and kidney failure.

Some signs and symptoms of oropharyngeal dysphagia include difficulty controlling food in the mouth, inability to control food or saliva in the mouth, difficulty initiating a swallow, coughing, choking, frequent pneumonia, unexplained weight loss, gurgly or wet voice after swallowing, nasal regurgitation, and patient complaint of swallowing difficulty. When asked where the food is getting stuck, patients will often point to the cervical (neck) region as the site of the obstruction. The actual site of obstruction is always at or below the level at which the level of obstruction is perceived.

The most common symptom of esophageal dysphagia is the inability to swallow solid food, which the patient will describe as 'becoming stuck' or 'held up' before it either passes into the stomach or is regurgitated. Pain on swallowing or odynophagia is a distinctive symptom that can be highly indicative of carcinoma, although it also has numerous other causes that are not related to cancer. Achalasia is a major exception to the usual pattern of dysphagia in that swallowing of fluid tends to cause more difficulty than swallowing solids. In achalasia, there is idiopathic destruction of parasympathetic ganglia of the Auerbach's (Myenteric) plexus of the entire esophagus, which results in functional narrowing of the lower esophagus, and peristaltic failure throughout its length.

=== Complications ===
Complications of dysphagia may include aspiration, pneumonia, dehydration, and weight loss.

== Causes ==
The following table enumerates possible causes of dysphagia:

Location	Cause
Oral dysphagia	Inflammation and infection; Tonsillitis; Peritonsillar abscess; Stomatitis; Tongue cancer; Neurological; Paralysis of soft palate, usually due to diphtheria in children and bulbar palsy in adults; Bell's palsy; Xerostomia/dry mouth – e.g., Sjogren's syndrome
Pharyngeal dysphagia	Lumen: Impacted foreign body; Wall: Pharyngitis; Paterson-Kelly syndrome; Pharyngeal spasms; Malignant neoplasm; Outside the wall: Retropharyngeal abscess; Lymphadenopathy of cervical lymph nodes; Thyroid malignancy; Eagle syndrome; Rabies
Esophageal dysphagia	Lumen; Impacted foreign body; Wall: Esophageal atresia; Benign strictures, due to reflux esophagitis, swallowed corrosives, tuberculosis, and radiotherapy, scleroderma/systemic sclerosis; Spasms, due to achalasia, Paterson-Kelly syndrome, esophageal webs, and esophageal rings; Neoplasms, such as esophageal cancer, esophageal leiomyoma; Nervous disorders, such as bulbar palsy, pseudobulbar palsy, post-vagotomy, myasthenia gravis; Crohn's disease; Candida esophagitis; Eosinophilic esophagitis; Outside the wall: Retrosternal goitre; Malignancy; Zenker's diverticulum; Aortic aneurysm; Mediastinal growth; Dysphagia lusoria; Periesophagitis; Hiatus hernia; Tight hiatus repairs/laparoscopic fundoplication; gastric banding

Structural anamolies, neurological, GERD, Pulmonary are aetiologies for dysphagia. Difficulty with or inability to swallow may be caused or exacerbated by the use of opioids. Other drugs such as cocaine may also induce it.

== Diagnosis ==
- Esophagoscopy and laryngoscopy can give direct view of lumens.
- Esophageal motility study is useful in cases of esophageal achalasia and diffuse esophageal spasms.
- Exfoliative cytology can be performed on esophageal lavage obtained by esophagoscopy. It can detect malignant cells in the early stage.
- Ultrasonography and CT scan are not very useful in finding causes of dysphagia, but can detect masses in the mediastinum and aortic aneurysms.
- FEES (Fibreoptic endoscopic evaluation of swallowing), sometimes with sensory evaluation, is usually done by a Medical Speech Pathologist or Deglutologist. This procedure involves the patient eating different consistencies as above.
- Swallowing sounds and vibrations could be potentially used for dysphagia screening, but these approaches are in the early research stages.

=== Differential diagnosis ===
All causes of dysphagia are considered as differential diagnoses. Some common ones are:

- Achalasia
- Amyotrophic lateral sclerosis (ALS)
- Benign strictures
- Cervical Spondylosis
- Charcot–Marie–Tooth disease
- Esophageal cancer
- Diffuse esophageal spasm
- Dysphagia lusoria
- Eosinophilic esophagitis
- Esophageal atresia
- Esophageal diverticula
- Esophageal varices
- Fahr's disease
- Hiatus hernia, especially paraesophageal type
- Multiple sclerosis
- Rabies
- Scleroderma
- Stroke
- Parkinson's disease
- Paterson-Kelly syndrome
- Polymyositis
- Webs and rings
- Wernicke encephalopathy
- Zenker's diverticulum

Esophageal dysphagia is almost always caused by disease in or adjacent to the esophagus, but occasionally the lesion is in the pharynx or stomach. In many of the pathological conditions causing dysphagia, the lumen becomes progressively narrowed and indistensible. Initially, only fibrous solids cause difficulty, but later the problem can extend to all solids and even to liquids. Patients with difficulty swallowing may benefit from thickened fluids if the person is more comfortable with those liquids, although, so far, there is no scientific study that proves that those thickened liquids are beneficial. Transnasal esophagoscopy (TNE) has emerged as a valuable diagnostic tool in the evaluation of esophageal dysphagia, particularly in outpatient and minimally invasive settings. A key clinical indicator of esophageal origin is the sensation of retrosternal bolus hold-up, where patients report that food appears to be stuck behind the sternum after swallowing. The presence of alarm symptoms, such as progressive dysphagia and unintentional weight loss, raises concern for serious underlying conditions, including esophageal malignancy, and necessitates prompt investigation. TNE allows direct visualization of the esophageal mucosa without the need for sedation and facilitates early detection of structural abnormalities such as strictures, lesions, or tumors. Therefore, it serves as an effective and accessible tool in the clinical assessment and early diagnosis of esophageal dysphagia (Clinical Diagnosis Using Transnasal Esophagoscopy, 2024).

Dysphagia may manifest as the result of autonomic nervous system pathologies including stroke and ALS, or due to rapid iatrogenic correction of an electrolyte imbalance.

In older adults, presbyphagia - the normal healthy changes in swallowing associated with age - should be considered as an alternative explanation for symptoms.

== Treatments ==
There are many ways to treat dysphagia, such as swallowing therapy, dietary changes, feeding tubes, certain medications, and surgery. Treatment for dysphagia is managed by a group of specialists known as a multidisciplinary team. Members of the multidisciplinary team include: a speech language pathologist specializing in swallowing disorders (swallowing therapist), primary physician, gastroenterologist, nursing staff, respiratory therapist, dietitian, occupational therapist, physical therapist, pharmacist, and radiologist. The role of the members of the multidisciplinary team will differ depending on the type of swallowing disorder present. For example, the swallowing therapist will be directly involved in the treatment of a patient with oropharyngeal dysphagia, while a gastroenterologist will be directly involved in the treatment of an esophageal disorder.

=== Treatment strategies ===
The implementation of a treatment strategy should be based on a thorough evaluation by the multidisciplinary team. Treatment strategies will differ on a patient-to-patient basis and should be structured to meet the specific needs of each individual patient. Treatment strategies are chosen based on a number of different factors, including diagnosis, prognosis, reaction to compensatory strategies, severity of dysphagia, cognitive status, respiratory function, caregiver support, and patient motivation and interest.

==== Oral vs. nonoral feeding ====
Adequate nutrition and hydration must be preserved at all times during dysphagia treatment. The overall goal of dysphagia therapy is to maintain or return the patient to oral feeding. However, this must be done while ensuring adequate nutrition and hydration and a safe swallow (no aspiration of food into the lungs). If oral feeding results in increased mealtimes and increased effort during the swallow, resulting in not enough food being ingested to maintain weight, a supplementary nonoral feeding method of nutrition may be needed. In addition, if the patient aspirates food or liquid into the lungs despite the use of compensatory strategies, and is therefore unsafe for oral feeding, nonoral feeding may be needed. Nonoral feeding includes receiving nutrition through a method that bypasses the oropharyngeal swallowing mechanism, including a nasogastric tube, gastrostomy, or jejunostomy. Some people with dysphagia, especially those nearing the end of life, may choose to continue eating and drinking orally even when it has been deemed unsafe. This is known as "risk feeding".

==== Swallowing difficulties in dementia ====
A 2018 Cochrane review found no conclusive evidence about the immediate and long-term effects of modifying the thickness of fluids for swallowing difficulties in people with dementia. While thickening fluids may have an immediate positive effect on swallowing and improving oral intake, the long-term impact on the health of the person with dementia should also be considered.

==== Treatment procedures ====
Compensatory treatment procedures are designed to change the flow of the food/liquids and eliminate symptoms, but do not directly change the physiology of the swallow.

- Postural techniques
- Food consistency (diet) changes
- Modifying volume and speed of food presentation
- Technique to improve oral sensory awareness
- Intraoral prosthetics

Therapeutic treatment procedures – designed to change and/or improve the physiology of the swallow.

- Oral and pharyngeal range-of-motion exercises
- Resistance exercises
- Bolus control exercises
- Swallowing maneuvers
  - Supraglottic swallow
  - Super-supraglottic swallow
  - Effortful swallow
  - Mendelsohn maneuver

Patients may need a combination of treatment procedures to maintain a safe and nutritionally adequate swallow. For example, postural strategies may be combined with swallowing maneuvers to allow the patient to swallow safely and efficiently.

The most common interventions used for those with oropharyngeal dysphagia by speech language pathologists are rehabilitation of the swallow through oral motor exercises, texture modification of foods, thickening fluids and positioning changes during swallowing. The effectiveness of modifying food and fluid in preventing aspiration pneumonia has been questioned and these can be associated with poorer nutrition, hydration and quality of life. Also, there has been considerable variability in national approaches to describing different degrees of thickened fluids and food textures. However, in 2015, the International Dysphagia Diet Standardisation Initiative (IDDSI) group produced an agreed IDDSI framework consisting of a continuum of 8 levels (0–7), where drinks are measured from Levels 0 – 4, while foods are measured from Levels 3 – 7. It is likely that this initiative, which has widespread support among dysphagia practitioners, will improve communication with caregivers and will lead to greater standardization of modified diets. There is also a larger movement within the field of speech-language pathology that advocates for dysphagia to be elevated within the school setting, as it is currently not considered necessary during a speech-language and oral evaluation of a child. However, proper nutrition, hydration, and the ability to swallow are critical for child's academic, social, and personal success.

== Epidemiology ==
Swallowing disorders can occur in all age groups, resulting from congenital abnormalities, structural damage, and/or medical conditions. Swallowing problems are a common complaint among older individuals, and the incidence of dysphagia is higher in the elderly, and in patients who have had strokes. Dysphagia affects about 3% of the population.

== Etymology ==
The word "dysphagia" is derived from the Greek dys meaning bad or disordered, and the root phag- meaning "eat".

== See also ==
- Aphagia
- MEGF10
- Pseudodysphagia, an irrational fear of swallowing or choking
