= Albert Plummer =

American politician (1840–1912)

Member of the Minnesota House of Representatives from the 2nd district
- In office January 2, 1883 – January 5, 1885

Personal details
- Born: August 9, 1840 Auburn, New Hampshire, U.S.
- Died: March 20, 1912 (aged 71) Rochester, Minnesota, U.S.
- Resting place: Hamilton Cemetery, Fillmore County, Minnesota, U.S.
- Spouse: Isabelle Steere (m. 1872)
- Children: 2, including Henry Stanley Plummer
- Education: Kimball Union Academy; Bowdoin College
- Occupation: Politician, physician

Military service
- Allegiance: United States (Union)
- Branch/service: United States Army (Union army)
- Years of service: 1862–1865
- Unit: 10th New Hampshire Volunteer Infantry
- Battles/wars: American Civil War

Albert Plummer (August 9, 1840 – March 20, 1912) was an American physician and legislator.

Born in Auburn, New Hampshire, Plummer graduated from Kimball Union Academy in Meriden, New Hampshire, and received his medical degree from Bowdoin College. He served in the 10th New Hampshire Volunteer Infantry during the American Civil War as a surgeon. In 1867, Plummer moved to Hamilton, Minnesota, where he practiced medicine. In 1883–1884, he served in the Minnesota House of Representatives. He died in Rochester, Minnesota. He was the father of Dr. Henry Stanley Plummer, an early partner of the Mayo brothers and one of the founders of the Mayo Clinic.
