= Plummer House (Rochester, Minnesota) =

Historic house in Minnesota, United States

- Henry S. Plummer House
- U.S. National Register of Historic Places
- U.S. Historic district – Contributing property
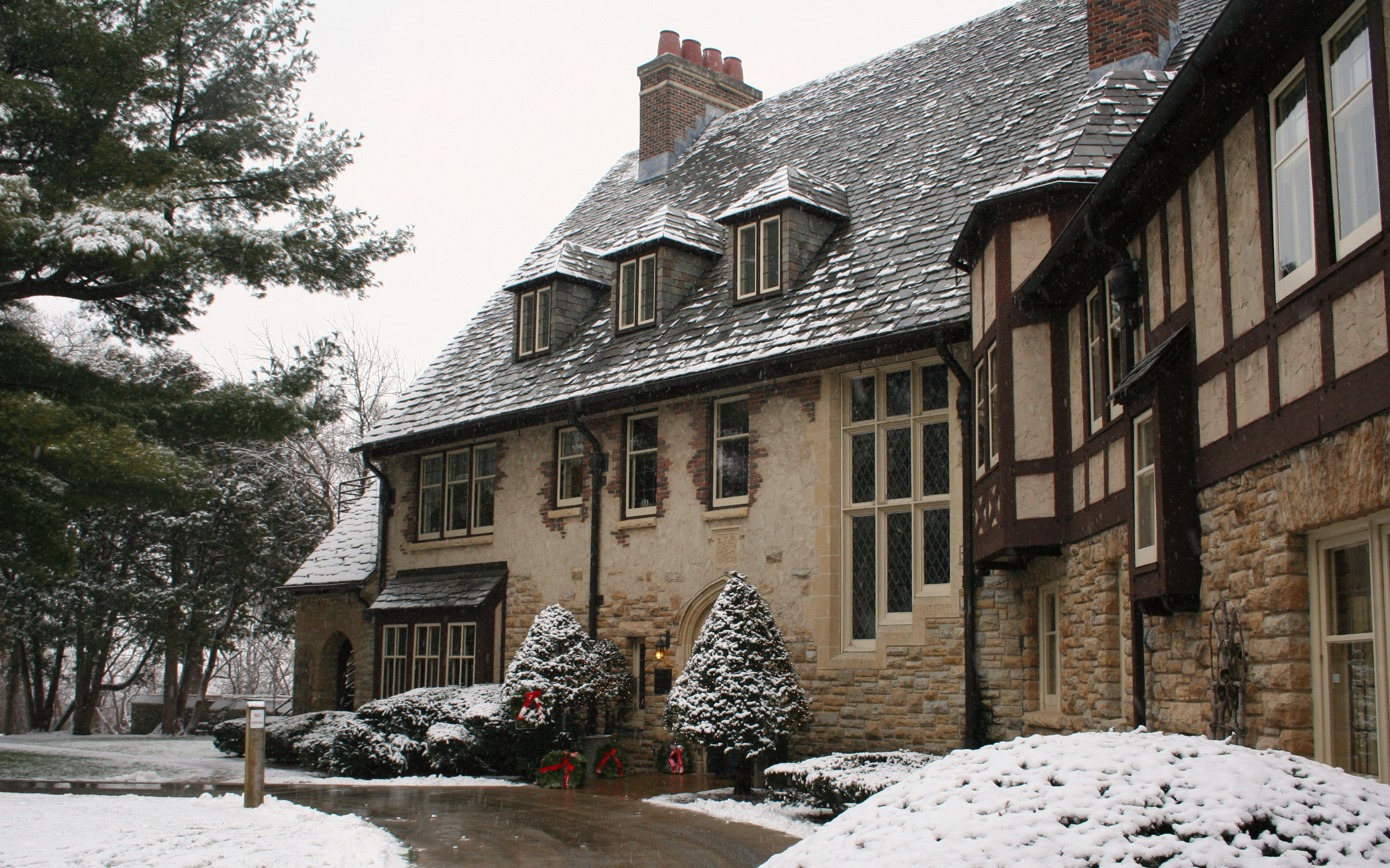
- Plummer House front side

- Location within Minnesota Location within the United States
- Interactive map showing the Plummer House’s location
- Location: 1091 Plummer Lane, Rochester, Minnesota
- Coordinates: 44°0′37″N 92°28′47″W
- Area: 2 acres (0.81 ha)
- Built: 1924
- Architect: Henry S. Plummer
- Architectural style: Tudor Revival
- NRHP reference No.: 75001002
- Added to NRHP: May 21, 1975

The Plummer House is the former residence of Dr. Henry Stanley Plummer and his wife Daisy Berkman Plummer, who was the eldest grandchild of Dr. William Worrall Mayo, and niece of the Mayo brothers. Located in Rochester, Minnesota and originally called Quarry Hill, the English Tudor mansion stood on a 65-acre (26 ha) estate which included a greenhouse, water tower, garage, and gazebo. The house is also called Henry S. Plummer House.

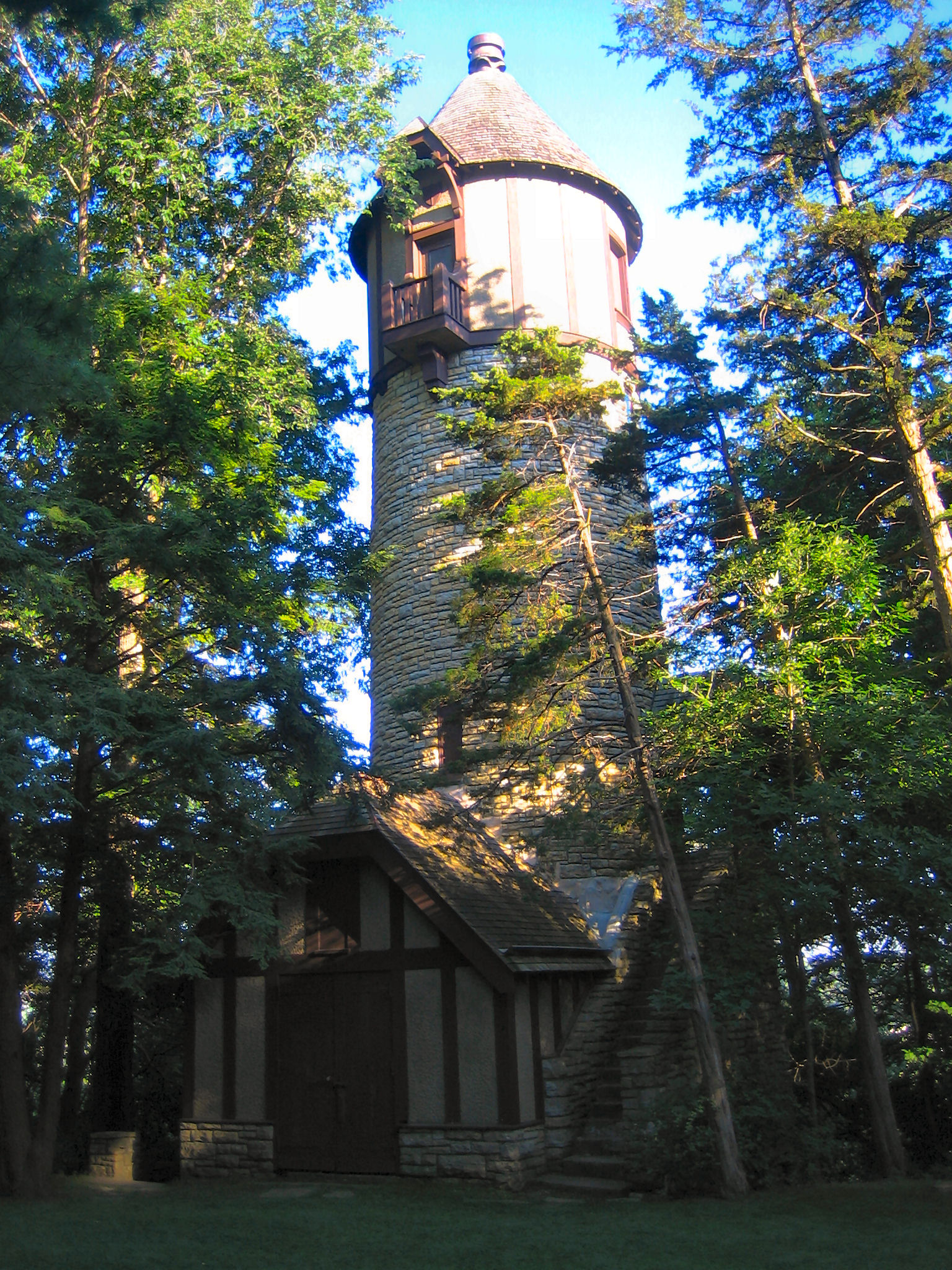
The water tower on the estate.

Dr. Plummer, a Mayo Clinic partner and founder, worked very closely with Ellerby and Round, the architects of record, on the design of the house. The house includes many innovations that were quite novel for their time, including a central vacuum system, underground sprinkler system, intercommunications system, dumbwaiter, security system, electricity and gas lighting, the first gas furnace in the city, garage door openers, heated pool, water tower, and two caves going into the house and the water tower. The 5 story home is over 300 feet (91 m) long, with 49 rooms including 10 bathrooms, 9 bedrooms, a 3rd floor ballroom, pipe organ, and 5 fireplaces. This translates to 11,000 square feet of living space and over 20,000 square feet total, including the basement and attached garage and greenhouse. There is a 220 ft long by 18 ft wide underground passageway connecting the main house to the caretakers cottage at the bottom of the hill.

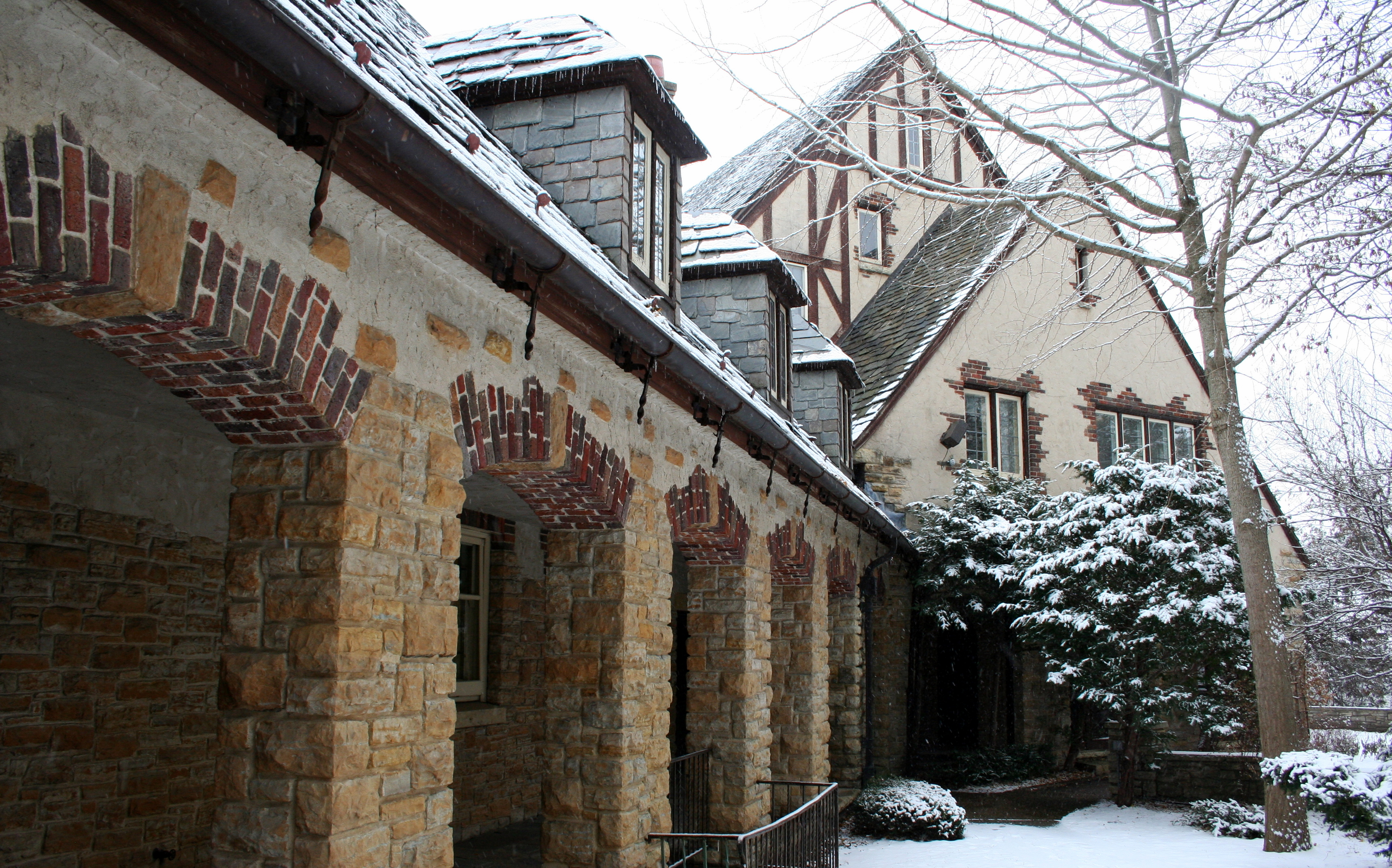
The back of the house.

After the death of Dr. Plummer in 1936, his wife, Daisy Berkman Plummer, and their two children, continued to live in the home until 1969. In 1971, Daisy Plummer and family gave the house with all its furnishings to the Rochester Art Center with the understanding that it would be operated as a Center for the Arts, to be used for music recitals and dance performances, as well as a setting for artists to create and show their work. The Plummer House was added to the National Register of Historic Places in 1975.

Today, Rochester Park and Rec maintains the building, and 11 acres (4.5 ha) of original estate, as a private rental facility. In the summer, the beautiful gardens make the Plummer House a popular venue for weddings. Visible from much of south west Rochester, the Plummer House and its water tower mark the summit of a Rochester neighborhood nicknamed Pill Hill, so called because it typically houses many Mayo doctors.
