= Richard Schatzki =

German-American radiologist (1901–1992)

Richard Schatzki (1901–1992) was a German-American radiologist. He was born in Klafeld, Germany on February 22, 1901. In 1933, Nazi leadership declared that no one of Jewish background could hold a position in German governmental facilities. As a result, Schatzki was forced to leave his University Hospital position. Four months later, Schatzki moved to America with his wife Greta and young son Stefan. They were the first Schatzkis to leave Germany, although other family members would join them in America in the years leading up to the war as conditions in Germany deteriorated further. Upon leaving his home nation, Germany, his wife was pregnant with their second son. After arriving in the United States, George Schatzki came into the world.

He trained in radiology in Berlin with Hans Heinrich Berg (1889-1968) who was the leading diagnostic radiologist in Germany at that time. He immigrated to the United States in 1933 and worked as a radiologist physician in Boston at MGH until 1943. He subsequently took a position as chief of radiology at Mount Auburn Hospital where he established a diagnostic radiology residency training program and was largely responsible for changing Mount Auburn from "minimally sophisticated community hospital into one of the teaching hospitals associated with Harvard Medical School.". He served as president of the New England Roentgen Ray Society, of which he became an honorary member in 1967.

In the 1950s, Schatzki first characterized a type of pathological stricture of the lower esophagus, which is now known as a Schatzki ring.
