= Peritonsillar abscess =

Pus behind the tonsil due to an infection

- Other names: Quinsy, quinsey
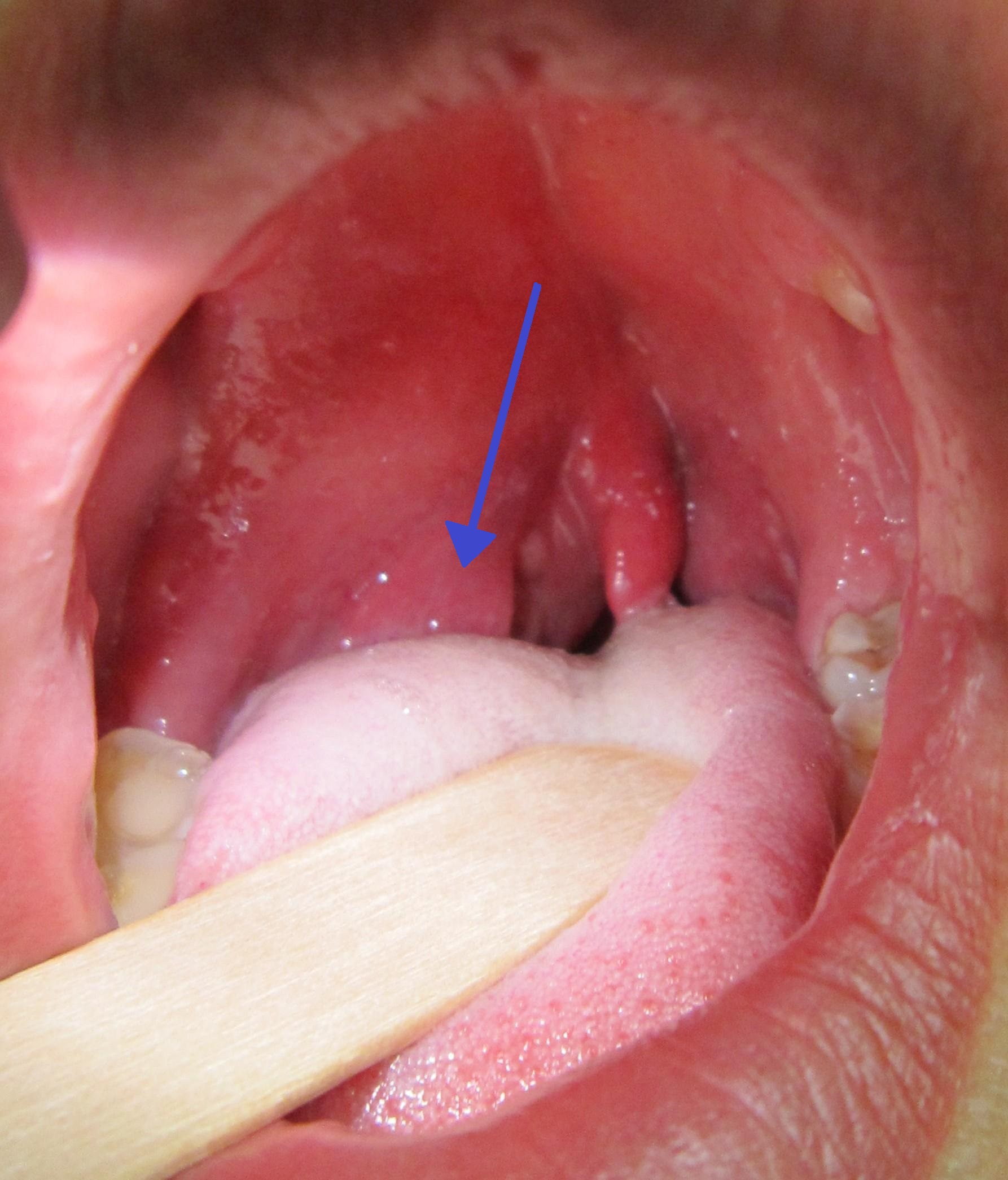
- Right-sided peritonsillar abscess
- Specialty: Otorhinolaryngology
- Symptoms: Fever, throat pain, trouble opening the mouth, change to the voice
- Complications: Blockage of the airway, aspiration pneumonitis
- Causes: Multiple types of bacteria
- Risk factors: Streptococcal pharyngitis
- Diagnostic method: Based on the symptoms
- Differential diagnosis: Retropharyngeal abscess, infectious mononucleosis, epiglottitis, cancer
- Treatment: Remove pus, antibiotics, fluids, pain medication, steroids
- Frequency: ~3 per 10,000 per year (USA)

A peritonsillar abscess (PTA), also known as a quinsy, is an accumulation of pus due to an infection behind the tonsil. Symptoms include fever, throat pain, trouble opening the mouth, and a change to the voice. Pain is usually worse on one side. Complications may include blockage of the airway or aspiration pneumonitis.

PTA is typically due to infection by several types of bacteria. Often, it follows streptococcal pharyngitis. They do not typically occur in those who have had a tonsillectomy. Diagnosis is usually based on the symptoms. Medical imaging may be done to rule out complications.

Treatment is by removing the pus, antibiotics, sufficient fluids, and pain medication. Steroids may also be useful. Hospital admission is generally not needed. In the United States, about 3 per 10,000 people per year are affected. Young adults are most commonly affected.

== Signs and symptoms ==
Physical signs of a peritonsillar abscess include redness and swelling in the tonsillar area of the affected side and swelling of the jugulodigastric lymph nodes. The uvula may be displaced towards the unaffected side.

Unlike tonsillitis, which is more common in children, PTA has a more even age spread, from children to adults. Symptoms start appearing two to eight days before the formation of an abscess. A progressively severe sore throat on one side and pain during swallowing (odynophagia) are usually the earliest symptoms. As the abscess develops, persistent pain in the peritonsillar area, fever, a general sense of feeling unwell, headache, and a distortion of vowels informally known as "hot potato voice" may appear. Neck pain associated with tender, swollen lymph nodes, referred ear pain, and foul breath are also common. While these signs may be present in tonsillitis itself, a PTA should be specifically considered if there is limited ability to open the mouth (trismus).

=== Complications ===
While most people recover uneventfully, a wide range of possible complications may occur. These may include:

- Retropharyngeal abscess
- Extension of the abscess in other deep neck spaces leading to airway compromise (see Ludwig's angina)
- Airway obstruction
- Aspiration pneumonitis
- Lung abscess (following rupture)
- Sepsis
- Life-threatening hemorrhage (following erosion or septic necrosis into the carotid sheath of the neck)
- Glomerulonephritis and rheumatic fever (chronic complications of strep throat)

Difficulty swallowing can lead to decreased oral intake and dehydration.

== Causes ==
PTA is usually a complication of an untreated or partially treated episode of acute tonsillitis. The infection, in these cases, spreads to the peritonsillar area (peritonsillitis). This region comprises loose connective tissue and is hence susceptible to the formation of an abscess. PTA can also occur de novo. Both aerobic and anaerobic bacteria can be causative. Commonly involved aerobic pathogens include Streptococcus, Staphylococcus and Haemophilus. The most common anaerobic species include Fusobacterium necrophorum, Peptostreptococcus, Prevotella species, and Bacteroides.

== Diagnosis ==
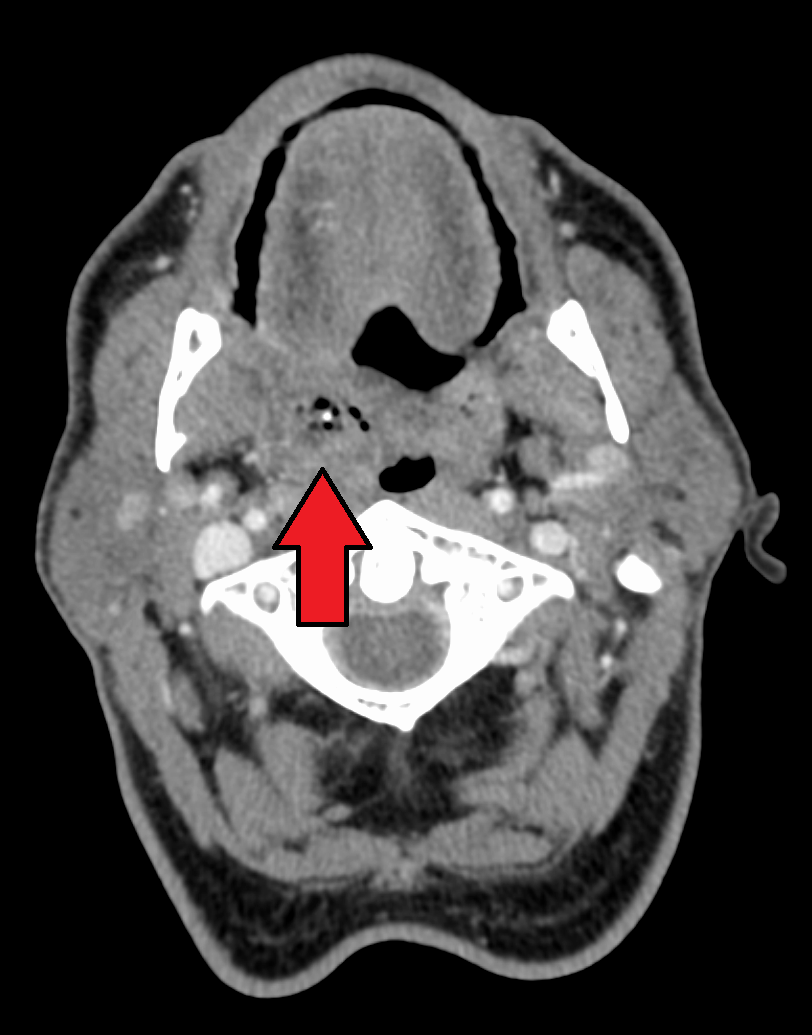
Peritonsillar abscess on the person's right as seen on CT imaging

Diagnosis is usually based on the symptoms. Medical imaging may be done to rule out complications. Medical imaging may include CT scan, MRI, or ultrasound is also useful in diagnosis.

== Treatment ==
Medical treatment with antibiotics, volume repletion with fluids, and pain medication is usually adequate, although in cases where airway obstruction or systemic sepsis occurs, surgical drainage may be necessary. Corticosteroids may also be useful. Hospital admission is generally not needed.

=== Medication ===
The infection is frequently penicillin resistant. There are several antibiotics options including amoxicillin/clavulanate, ampicillin/sulbactam, clindamycin, or metronidazole in combination with benzylpenicillin (penicillin G) or penicillin V. Piperacillin/tazobactam may also be used.

=== Surgery ===
The pus can be removed by several methods, including needle aspiration, incision and drainage, and tonsillectomy. Incision and drainage may be associated with a lower chance of recurrence than needle aspiration, but the evidence is very uncertain. Needle aspiration may be less painful, but again, the evidence is very uncertain.

Treatment can also be given while a patient is under anesthesia, but this is usually reserved for children or anxious patients. Tonsillectomy can be indicated if a patient has recurring peritonsillar abscesses or a history of tonsillitis. For patients with their first peritonsillar abscess, most ENT surgeons prefer to "wait and observe" before recommending tonsillectomy.

== Epidemiology ==
It is a commonly encountered otorhinolaryngological (ENT) emergency.

The number of new cases per year of peritonsillar abscess in the United States has been estimated at approximately 30 cases per 100,000 people. In a study in Northern Ireland, the number of new cases was 10 cases per 100,000 people per year. In Denmark, the number of new cases is higher and reaches 41 cases per 100,000 people per year. Younger children who develop a peritonsillar abscess are often immunocompromised and in them, the infection can cause airway obstruction.

== Etymology ==
The condition is often referred to as quincy, quinsy, or quinsey, anglicised versions of the French word esquinancie which was originally rendered as squinancy, squinzey and subsequently quinsy. (Note: Greene states that the "squinzey" spelling dates from "the time of Jeremy Taylor". However, Taylor's book Holy Living and Holy Dying uses "squinancy".)

== Notable cases ==
- Sultan Tekish of Kwarezm
- Pope Adrian IV
- Osceola
- Michel de Montaigne
- Dan Minogue, the captain/coach of the Australian Rules football team Richmond was rumoured to be dead a week before the 1920 VFL Grand Final, but in fact, was in his hometown of Bendigo recovering from quinsy.
- Eiichiro Oda, author of the best-selling One Piece manga, was hospitalized due to complications.
- Ian Maclaren died of complications from quinsy while on a lecture tour of the United States.

The ancient Roman goddess Angerona was claimed to cure quinsy (Latin angina) in humans and sheep.

== See also ==
- Parapharyngeal abscess
