= Parapharyngeal abscess =

Deep neck abscess

A parapharyngeal abscess is a deep neck space abscess of the parapharyngeal space (or pharyngomaxillary space), which is lateral to the superior pharyngeal constrictor muscle and medial to the masseter muscle. This space is divided by the styloid process into anterior and posterior compartments. The posterior compartment contains the carotid artery, internal jugular vein, and many nerves.

== Signs and symptoms ==
Symptoms include fever, sore throat, painful swallowing, and swelling in the neck. An anterior space abscess can cause lockjaw (spasm of jaw muscle), and hard mass formation along the angle of the mandible, with medial bulging of the tonsil and lateral pharyngeal wall. A posterior space abscess causes swelling in the posterior pharyngeal wall, and lockjaw is minimal. Other structures within the carotid sheath may be involved, causing rigors, high fever, bacteremia, neurologic deficit, or a massive haemorrhage caused by carotid artery rupture.

== Cause ==
Infection can occur from:

- Pharynx: acute and chronic infection of tonsil and adenoids
- Teeth: dental infection occurs from lower last molar tooth
- Ear: Bezold's abscess and petrositis
- Other space: infection of parotid retropharyngeal space
- External trauma: penetrating injuries of neck, injection of local anaesthetic

== Epidemiology ==
Parapharyngeal abscess is more common in male than the female gender. Any age group can develop a parapharyngeal abscess but it is most commonly seen in children and adolescents. Adults who are immunocompromised are also at high risk.

== See also ==
- Peritonsillar abscess
