= Hamilton, Minnesota =

Unincorporated community in Minnesota, United States

Hamilton
- Unincorporated community
- Location within Minnesota Location within the United States
- Coordinates: 43°45′42″N 92°26′55″W
- Country: United States
- State: Minnesota
- County: Fillmore
- Elevation: 1,260 ft (380 m)
- Time zone: UTC-6 (Central (CST))
  - Summer (DST): UTC-5 (CDT)
- Area code: 507
- GNIS feature ID: 654741

Hamilton is an unincorporated community in Fillmore County, Minnesota, United States.

== History ==
Hamilton was platted in 1855. A post office called Hamilton was established in 1863, and remained in operation until 1904.

== Notable people ==
- Albert Plummer, physician and legislator
- Henry Stanley Plummer, physician

Historical population
Census	Pop.	Note	%±
1880	100		—
U.S. Decennial Census
