= Food bolus =

Mixture of food and saliva formed by chewing

A food bolus (from Latin bolus, meaning 'ball') is a mass of chewed food mixed with saliva that forms in the mouth during the process of mastication (chewing). It is shaped by the tongue and teeth into a cohesive, lubricated ball to facilitate safer and more efficient deglutition (swallowing).

Under normal circumstances, the bolus is swallowed and travels down the esophagus to the stomach, where it is further broken down.

== Formation and composition ==
The formation of a bolus begins the moment food enters the oral cavity. The teeth fracture and grind the food into smaller particles, while the tongue manipulates the mass against the hard palate, molding it into a singular, spherical shape.

Salivary glands secrete saliva, which coats the food particles. Saliva contains water, electrolytes, and mucus (which acts as a lubricant to reduce friction against the throat walls). It also contains digestive enzymes like salivary amylase, which initiates the breakdown of complex carbohydrates, and lingual lipase, which begins lipid digestion.

The physical appearance and color of the bolus depend entirely on the food being consumed. Because saliva is rich in bicarbonate ions, the bolus typically maintains a slightly alkaline to neutral pH (around 6.7 to 7.3) while in the mouth.

== Deglutition and transit ==
Once the bolus reaches the appropriate consistency and size, the tongue voluntarily pushes it backward into the pharynx, initiating the involuntary stage of swallowing.

During transit, the epiglottis folds down to seal off the trachea (windpipe), preventing the bolus from entering the respiratory tract. The upper esophageal sphincter relaxes to allow the bolus into the esophagus. It is then propelled downward toward the stomach via peristalsis—a series of coordinated, wave-like muscular contractions. This journey typically takes between 4 and 8 seconds for solid food.

Upon passing through the lower esophageal sphincter, the bolus enters the stomach. In the stomach, the bolus mixes with gastric secretions and is mechanically processed, transforming into a semi-fluid mass known as chyme.

== Clinical significance ==
=== Esophageal food bolus obstruction ===
Sometimes, a bolus may become lodged or impacted in the esophagus, a medical emergency known as an esophageal food bolus obstruction (EFBO). This most commonly occurs when poorly chewed meats or dense foods are swallowed too quickly, or if the individual suffers from underlying esophageal conditions such as:

- Schatzki rings (narrowing of the lower esophagus)
- Eosinophilic esophagitis (chronic immune inflammation)
- Esophageal strictures or motility disorders

== See also ==
- Chyme – The semi-fluid mass of partly digested food expelled by the stomach.
- Chyle – A milky bodily fluid consisting of lymph and emulsified fats formed in the small intestine.
- Peristalsis – The wave-like muscle contractions that move the bolus.
