= Porter Paisley Vinson =

American surgeon

Porter Paisley Vinson (January 24, 1890 – August 28, 1959) was a surgeon at the Mayo Clinic. He was born to William Daniel Vinson and Lillie Helper Vinson. He was a doctor of bronchoscopy. He married Lenore Dunlap and had three children. He died in 1959.

== Achievements ==
Vinson is best known for his contribution to medicine in the study of Plummer–Vinson syndrome. There is an award given in his name to promising students in chemistry at Davidson College, NC.
