= Pseudodysphagia =

Fear of swallowing or choking

- Specialty: Psychiatry

Pseudodysphagia, in its severe form, is the irrational fear of swallowing or, in its minor form, of choking. The symptoms are psychosomatic, so while the sensation of difficult swallowing feels authentic to the individual, it is not based on a real physical symptom. It is important that dysphagia (difficult or painful swallowing) be ruled out before a diagnosis of pseudodysphagia is made.

Fear of choking is associated with anxiety, depression, panic attacks, hypochondriasis, and weight loss. The condition can occur in children and adults, and is equally common in men and women. Quality of life can be severely affected.

== Symptoms ==
Individuals with pseudodysphagia have difficulty swallowing, and may experience panic before or during the act of swallowing. This can therefore lead to the avoidance of swallowing solid foods and liquids, taking any forms of tablets or pills without the presence of physiological or anatomical abnormalities. Avoidance of restaurants or social settings is common, since sometimes food can only be taken in small bites or with liquid. Furthermore, the resulting avoidance of food and drinks caused by the phobic stimulus may ultimately lead to weight loss, anxiety, depressions and social withdrawal. The strain is generally bounded to solids, however the essence of the difficulty can vary where most patients are able to consume semi solids or soft foods, whereas some are able to only consume when the food is properly lubricated or only solid foods in small pieces. Furthermore, some patients experience the inability to swallow pills or are afraid to drink liquids.

== Causes ==
It has been suggested that pseudodysphagia occurs most frequently secondary to a traumatic experience of being choked by food. The act of swallowing becomes mentally linked with choking or with reduced capacity of the opening of the throat. Pseudodysphagia has a tendency to evolve progressively, as the patient becomes more and more preoccupied with the idea that swallowing will lead to choking, until this anxiety becomes a constant sensation whenever food is being consumed. Such events cause negative internal feedback to obtain exponential momentum, as the initial presence of fear gradually mounts into an inevitable and immense obsession. This anxiety will in time become strong enough to cause psychosomatic choking symptoms.

=== Psychological and psychiatric studies ===
In 1982, Di Scipio and Kaslon conducted a controlled study with children within 1 year of having surgery for their cleft palate. Through the use of a questionnaire, a comparison was made between the eating patterns of these children with the habits of their siblings and an additional control group of children. The questionnaire included 32 questions relating to eating, including questions referring to taste aversion to different types of food. The questionnaire was also given out to close contact adults that were aware of the children's eating habits. It was found that the children which had surgery possessed higher scores of feeding difficulties on the questionnaire than the two control groups. The items that contrasted the most between the different groups were "Small bites", "Has to be prompted", "Requires assistance", and "Does not finish".

It was concluded that the difficulties in feeding were produced by classical (Pavlovian) conditioning. The unconditional stimuli being the physical damage in the course of the surgery, the obtrusive diagnostic approaches, the vomiting or poor suckling before the surgery had been temporarily paired with swallowing which resulted in the conditioned refraining of swallowing.

== Treatment ==
Since pseudodysphagia tends to coincide with a mixture of other mental disorders such as generalised anxiety disorder, therapists endorse an extensive and multi-pronged treatment scheme. Such programs address the psychological issues related to pseudodysphagia first, which make the choking phobia easier to oppose later on with retraining schemes and talk therapy which centre on helping the patient learn to relax whilst eating. Proposed treatments include hypnotherapy, cognitive behavioural therapy and eye movement desensitisation and reprocessing. Aversion relief therapy is a commonly used treatment which has been proven to be effective in the field of choking phobias. In this case, the patient is given a small shock to their fingers until they swallow. In order to get relief, the patient will have no other option but to swallow the food since the shock only stops once the action of swallowing occurs. Another possible treatment for pseudodysphagia includes tongue depressors placed on the back of the throat in order for the patient to defeat the anxiety associated with swallowing. (Whitehead and Schuster 1958) Lastly, relaxation sessions can take place before meals. Such treatments include positive visualisation, deep breathing, and guided meditation. Although pharmacotherapy such as low doses of selective serotonin reuptake inhibitors have been used for treatment, it is more common for behavioural approaches to be used.

Before diagnosing pseudodysphagia, it is essential to rule out underlying conditions that may cause choking symptoms. Dysphagia, for example, can result from structural or functional problems affecting the oesophagus. Other possibilities include Omohyoid muscle syndrome, a rare condition causing chronic pain during swallowing, which can mimic pseudodysphagia. Misdiagnosis with conversion disorder (globus pharyngeus) or eating disorders is also relatively common.

=== Treatment studies ===
In 1978, Di Scipio et al. medicated three children under the age of 2 1/2 with the inability to swallow. Two of the children had earlier undergone oropharyngeal surgery whilst the other child had an uncertain diagnosis however the strain was examined to be a congenital neurological disorder and possibly pseudobulbar palsy. Those children were fed by a gastrostomy. The phobia was unexplained but may have accumulated after a traumatic incident of a barium swallow.

The treatment in these three cases comprised:

1. positive reinforcement of the psychomotor constituent of oral consumption;
2. tube feeding made dependent on oral feeding (the children were fed through a tube once the child attempted swallowing);
3. introduction of massed learning tests over 72 hour periods.

This treatment took place between 1 and 2 years.

== See also ==
- Odynophagia
