= David Bayford =

British surgeon (c. 1739–1790)

- Born: 1739
- Died: 1790 (aged 50–51)
- Occupations: Surgeon and physician
- Known for: Dysphagia lusoria

David Bayford, FRS (c.1739 – 1790) was a London surgeon, who practised from 1761 to 1782. In later years of his life he practised as a physician.

== Career ==
He was born in Hertfordshire and educated as a surgeon. He became a member of the Corporation of Surgeons, and practised as such for some years at Lewes, Sussex.

In 1761, while still an apprentice surgeon, he made his discovery of the unique and bizarre cause—compression of the oesophagus by an aberrant right subclavian artery—of a fatal case of obstructed deglutition for which he coined the term dysphagia lusoria and for which he is eponymously remembered. This discovery remained unrecorded until 1787, when a paper describing the case was read on his behalf before the Medical Society of London.

He was elected a Fellow of the Royal Society in 1770, when he was described as a Professor of Anatomy at Surgeon's Hall; and many years Lecturer in that Science and the Operations of Surgery.

He was created MD by Frederick Cornwallis, Archbishop of Canterbury, in 1782. Later disbarred as a surgeon, he was admitted a Licentiate of the College of Physicians in 1787.
