= Dysphagia lusoria =

- The right subclavian artery is involved in this condition

Dysphagia lusoria (or Bayford-Autenrieth dysphagia) is an abnormal condition characterized by difficulty in swallowing caused by an aberrant right subclavian artery. It was discovered by David Bayford in 1761 and first reported in a paper by the same in 1787.

== Pathophysiology ==
During development of aortic arch, if the proximal portion of the right fourth arch disappears instead of distal portion, the right subclavian artery will arise as the last branch of aortic arch. It then courses behind the esophagus (or rarely in front of esophagus, or even in front of trachea) to supply blood to right arm. This causes pressure on esophagus and results in dysphagia. It can sometimes result in upper gastrointestinal tract bleeding. Investigation of choice - CT angiography

== Treatment ==
Surgical repair is performed. Reconstruction or ligation of aberrant right subclavian artery by sternotomy/by neck approach.

== Eponym ==
David Bayford called it dysphagia lusoria because in Latin, lusus naturæ means sports of nature, freak of nature, or natural anomaly. Bayford-Autenrieth dysphagia is eponym for Bayford and Autenrieth.

== See also ==
- Aberrant subclavian artery
- Ortner's syndrome
