= Schatzki ring =

Narrowing of the lower esophagus due to mucosal or muscular tissue

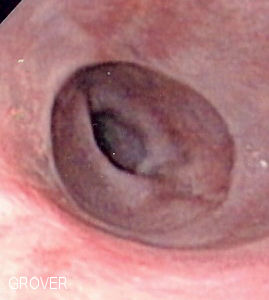
- Endoscopic image of Schatzki ring, seen in the esophagus with the gastro-esophageal junction in the background.
- Specialty: Medical genetics

A Schatzki ring or Schatzki–Gary ring is a narrowing of the lower esophagus that can cause difficulty swallowing (dysphagia). The narrowing is caused by a ring of mucosal tissue (which lines the esophagus) or muscular tissue. A Schatzki ring is a specific type of "esophageal ring", and Schatzki rings are further subdivided into those above the esophagus/stomach junction (A rings), and those found at the squamocolumnar junction in the lower esophagus (B rings).

Patients with Schatzki rings can develop intermittent difficulty swallowing or, more seriously, a completely blocked esophagus. The ring is named after the German-American physician Richard Schatzki.

== Signs and symptoms ==
Most Schatzki rings are asymptomatic.

When Schatzki rings cause symptoms, they usually result in episodic difficulties with swallowing (dysphagia) of solid foods, or a sensation that the food "sticks" while swallowing, especially if the food is not chewed thoroughly. Patients usually are able to regurgitate or force through the food material and resume eating. However, complete obstruction of the esophagus by a bolus of food (often called steakhouse syndrome) can occur. This can cause crushing chest pain and may need immediate treatment with endoscopy, which is the use of a specialized fibre-optic camera in order to remove the lodged food. After the obstruction is located, snares or forceps are inserted to pull the food out of the esophagus or to push it into the stomach. The latter is done with caution, usually when the anatomy of the structures around the obstruction is already known.

=== Other associations ===
- Schatzki rings can be associated with swallow syncope, a rare variety of syncope.
- Schatzki rings are associated with a lesser incidence of Barrett's esophagus, which is considered to be a pre-cancerous condition of the esophagus in some cases.

== Cause ==
Although many hypotheses have been proffered, the cause of Schatzki rings remains uncertain; both congenital and acquired factors may be involved.

== Diagnosis ==
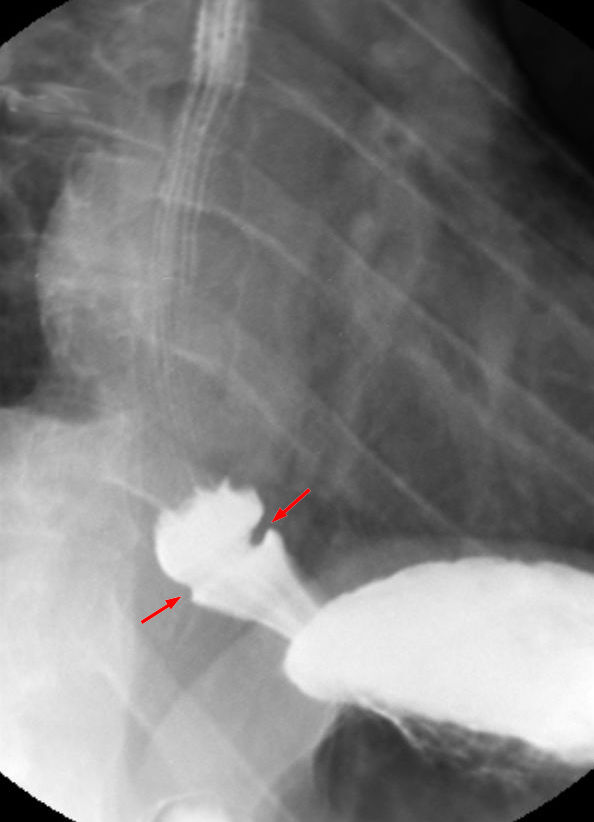
Schatzki B ring at barium swallow.

A Schatzki ring is usually diagnosed by esophagogastroduodenoscopy or barium swallow. Endoscopy usually shows a ring within the lumen of the esophagus, which can be of variable size (see picture). The ring is usually located a few centimetres above the gastro-esophageal junction, where the esophagus joins the stomach. Schatzki rings can often resemble a related entity called an esophageal web. Esophageal webs also contain extra mucosal tissue, but do not completely encircle the esophagus.

Endoscopies and barium swallows done for other reasons often reveal unsuspected Schatzki rings, as most are asymptomatic.

Two varieties of Schatzki rings have been described. The original description by Schatzki and Gary was of a ring of fibrous tissue seen on autopsy; this is the less common type of Schatzki ring. More commonly, the ring consists of the same mucosal tissue that lines the entire esophagus.

== Treatment ==
Symptomatic Schatzki rings may be treated with esophageal dilatation, using bougie or balloon dilators. These are equally effective. Bougie dilatation involves passage of long dilating tubes of increasing size down the esophagus to stretch the area of narrowing, either over a guidewire passed into the stomach by endoscopy (the Savary-Gillard system) or using mercury-weighted dilators (the Maloney system). This is usually done with intravenous sedation to reduce discomfort. Dilatation can produce some temporary irritation. A short course of proton pump inhibitor therapy may decrease aggravation by stomach acid reflux into the esophagus. The duration of the benefit of dilation varies, but may be from months to years. Dilation may be repeated if narrowing recurs.

== Epidemiology ==
About 6 to 14 percent of patients who receive a routine barium swallow test of the esophagus are found to have a Schatzki ring.

== See also ==
- Dysphagia
- Esophageal web
- Esophageal dilatation
