= Odynophagia =

Pain when swallowing

- Pronunciation: /oʊˌdɪnəˈfeɪdʒ(i)ə/
- Specialty: Otorhinolaryngology, gastroenterology

Odynophagia is pain when swallowing. The pain may be felt in the mouth or throat and can occur with or without difficulty swallowing. The pain may be described as an ache, burning sensation, or occasionally a stabbing pain that radiates to the back. Odynophagia often results in inadvertent weight loss. The term is from odyno- 'pain' and phagō 'to eat'.

== Causes ==
Odynophagia may have environmental or behavioral causes, such as:

- Very hot or cold food and drinks (termed cryodynophagia when associated with cold drinks, classically in the setting of cryoglobulinaemia).
- Taking certain medications
- Using drugs, tobacco, or alcohol
- Trauma or injury to the mouth, throat, or tongue

It can also be caused by certain medical conditions, such as:

- Ulcers
- Abscesses
- Upper respiratory tract infections
- Inflammation or infection of the mouth, tongue, or throat (esophagitis, pharyngitis, tonsillitis, epiglottitis)
- Oral or throat cancer

== See also ==
- Phagophobia
