= Esophageal web =

Abnormal membrane in the esophagus

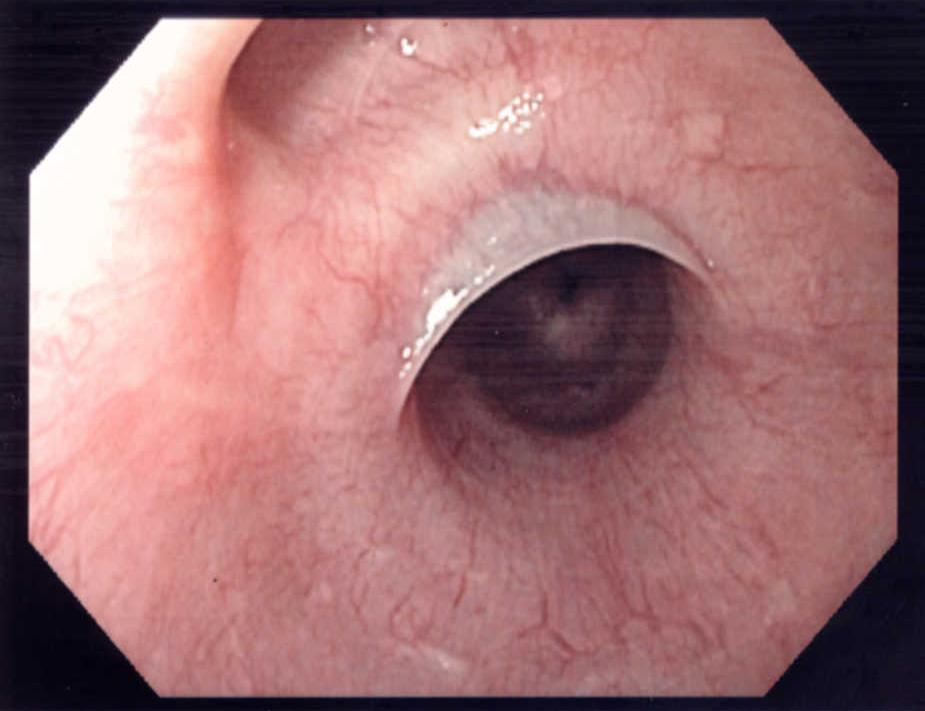
- Specialty: Gastroenterology

Esophageal webs are thin membranes occurring anywhere along the esophagus.

== Presentation ==
Its main symptoms are pain and difficulty in swallowing (dysphagia).

Esophageal webs are thin 2–3 mm (0.08–0.12 in) membranes of normal esophageal tissue consisting of mucosa and submucosa that can partially protrude/obstruct the esophagus. They can be congenital or acquired. Congenital webs commonly appear in the middle and inferior third of the esophagus, and they are more likely to be circumferential with a central or eccentric orifice. Acquired webs are much more common than congenital webs and typically appear in the cervical area (postcricoid).

Clinical symptoms of this condition are selective (solid more than liquids) dysphagia, thoracic pain, nasopharyngeal reflux, aspiration, perforation, and food impaction (the last two are very rare).

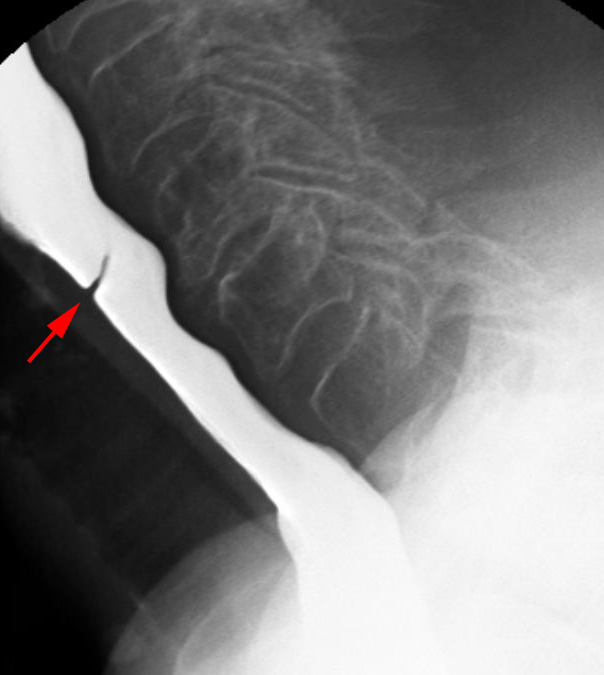
Esophageal web stenosis in barium swallow examination lateral view.

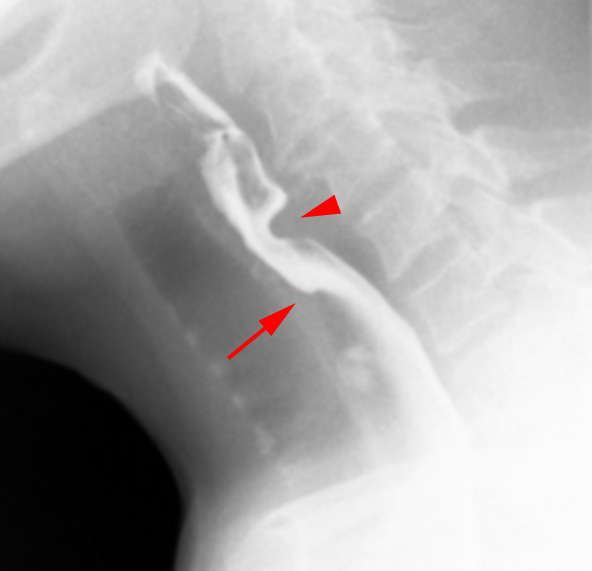
Web with "jet-phenomenon". Arrowhead on the incomplete opening of the upper esophageal sphincter.

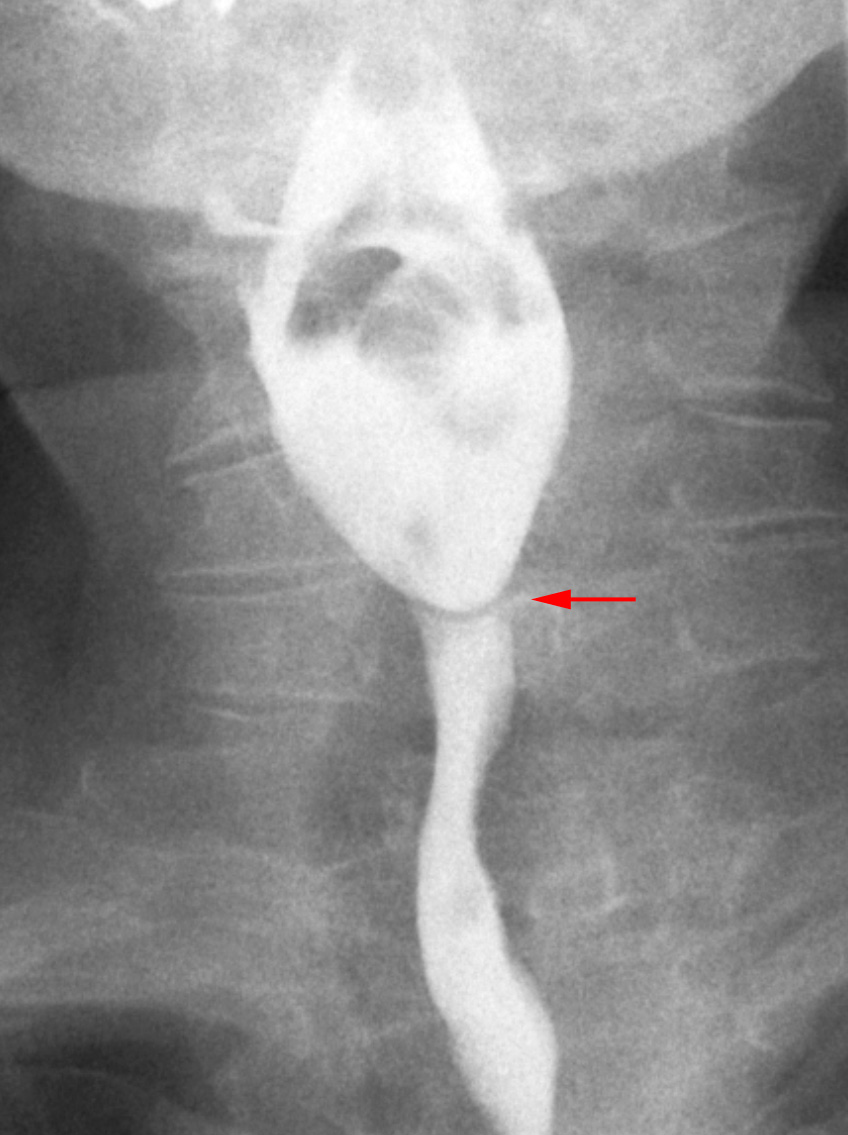
Esophageal web stenosis in barium swallow examination, frontal view.

== Causes ==
They are mainly observed in the Plummer–Vinson syndrome, which is associated with chronic iron deficiency anemia. Studies found that one in 10 patients with Plummer-Vinson syndrome will eventually develop squamous cell carcinoma of the esophagus, but it is unclear if esophageal webs themselves are a risk factor.

Esophageal webs are associated with bullous diseases (such as epidermolysis bullosa, pemphigus, and bullous pemphigoid), with graft versus host disease involving the esophagus, and with celiac disease.

Esophageal webs are more common in white individuals and in women (with a ratio of 2:1). The literature describes relations between these webs and Plummer-Vinson Syndrome, bullous dermatologic disorders, inlet patch, graft-versus-host disease, and celiac disease. The postulated mechanisms are sideropenic anemia (mechanism unknown) or some interference of the immune system. Esophageal webs can be ruptured during upper endoscopy.

== Diagnosis ==
The diagnostic test of choice is a barium swallow.

== Treatment ==
Esophageal webs and rings can be treated with endoscopic dilation.
