= Manometry =

Manometry refers to pressure measurement (usually in a medical context), taking forms including:

- Esophageal manometry, or Esophageal motility study
- Anorectal manometry
- Rhinomanometry
