= Esophageal motility disorder =

Inability to coordinate movement of the esophagus

- Other names: Esophageal dysmotility (ED)
- Diagnostic method: Esophageal motility study Functional Lumen Imaging Probe
- Treatment: treatment depends on cause

An esophageal motility disorder (EMD) is any medical disorder resulting from dysfunction of the coordinated movement of esophagus, which causes dysphagia (i.e. difficulty in swallowing, regurgitation of food).

Primary motility disorders are:

- Achalasia
- Diffuse esophageal spasm
- Nutcracker esophagus
- Hypertensive lower esophageal sphincter

An esophageal motility disorder can also be secondary to other diseases. For example, it may be a result of CREST syndrome, referring to the five main features: calcinosis, Raynaud syndrome, esophageal dysmotility, sclerodactyly and telangiectasia.

== Symptoms ==
The most common symptom of esophageal motility disorders is dysphagia. Compared to causes of mechanical obstruction, which usually coincide with difficulties only with solids, dysphagia occurs in both solid foods and liquids. Heartburn, odynophagia, chest pain, and dyspnea are frequent symptoms of esophageal motility disorders, as they are in other esophageal disorders. Advanced achalasia is characterized by regurgitation of previously swallowed, undigested food material. Individuals with diffuse esophageal spasm or nutcracker esophagus, due to disordered peristalsis propagation, may experience severe chest pain and dysphagia, mimicking cardiac ischemia.

Achalasia's most common symptoms include dysphagia (difficulty swallowing solids and liquids), regurgitation of undigested food, respiratory issues (aspiration and nocturnal cough), chest pain, and weight loss.

Diffuse esophageal spasm (DES) is a motility disorder characterized by recurrent episodes of chest pain or dysphagia as well as nonpropulsive (tertiary) contractions on radiographs.

Nutcracker esophagus is characterized by high-amplitude peristaltic contractions that are frequently prolonged and cause dysphagia and chest pain.

HLES (hypertensive lower esophageal sphincter) is a rare manometric abnormality seen among individuals with dysphagia, chest pain, gastroesophageal reflux, and hiatal hernia.

== Diagnosis ==
Testing to diagnose EMD includes barium esophagography, upper endoscopy, and esophageal manometry.

== Treatment ==
There is no cure for EMD, but symptoms can be managed. Some symptom management includes eating slower and taking smaller bites; in some cases medications can be useful to manage other issues that contribute to EMD such as a proton pump inhibitor to ease gastroesophageal reflux (acid reflux), or a smooth muscle relaxant for issues with the muscles.

== See also ==
- Esophageal disease
- Esophageal motility study
- Esophageal spasm
- GERD
- Nutcracker esophagus
- Esophagogastric junction outflow obstruction
- Systemic sclerosis
- Esophageal food bolus obstruction
- Dysphagia
- Functional Lumen Imaging Probe
