= Stricture =

Stricture may refer to:

- Stricture (medicine), a narrowing of a tubular structure, in medicine
  - Esophageal stricture, in medicine
- A feature of the Perl programming language
- Tenet, in religion
- Degree of contact, in a consonant
