= Heartburn =

Burning sensation felt behind the breastbone

- Other names: Indigestion, sour stomach, acid regurgitation, bitter belching, cardalgia, cardialgy, and pyrosis
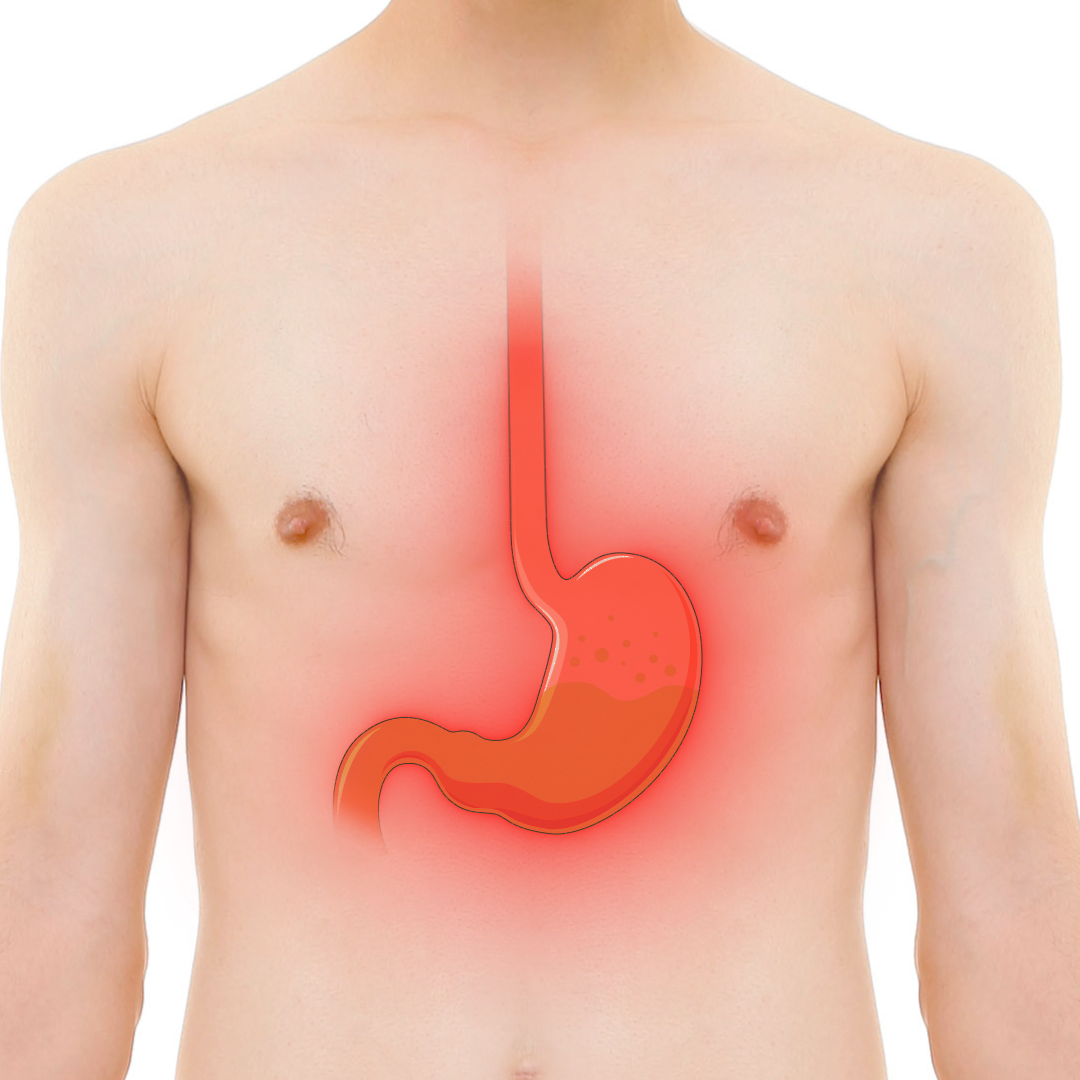
- Specialty: Gastroenterology

Heartburn is a burning sensation felt behind the breastbone. It is a symptom that is commonly linked to acid reflux (Note: Acid reflux is when stomach acid travels upward into a person's throat.) and is often triggered by food. Lying down, bending, lifting, and performing certain exercises can exacerbate heartburn. Causes include acid reflux, gastroesophageal reflux disease (GERD), (Note: Gastroesophageal reflux disease (GERD) is a disease in which acid reflux causes symptoms or damage to the esophagus. GERD is a chronic form of acid reflux.) damage to the esophageal lining, bile acid, mechanical stimulation to the esophagus, and esophageal hypersensitivity. Heartburn affects 25% of the population at least once a month.

Endoscopy and esophageal pH monitoring can be used to evaluate heartburn. Some causes of heartburn, such as GERD, may be diagnosed based on symptoms alone. Potential differential diagnoses for heartburn include motility disorders, ulcers, inflammation of the esophagus, and medication side effects. Lifestyle changes, such as losing weight and avoiding fatty foods, can improve heartburn. Over-the-counter alginates or antacids can help with mild or occasional heartburn. Heartburn treatment primarily involves antisecretory medications like H2 receptor antagonists (H2RAs) and proton-pump inhibitors (PPIs).

== Definition and symptoms ==
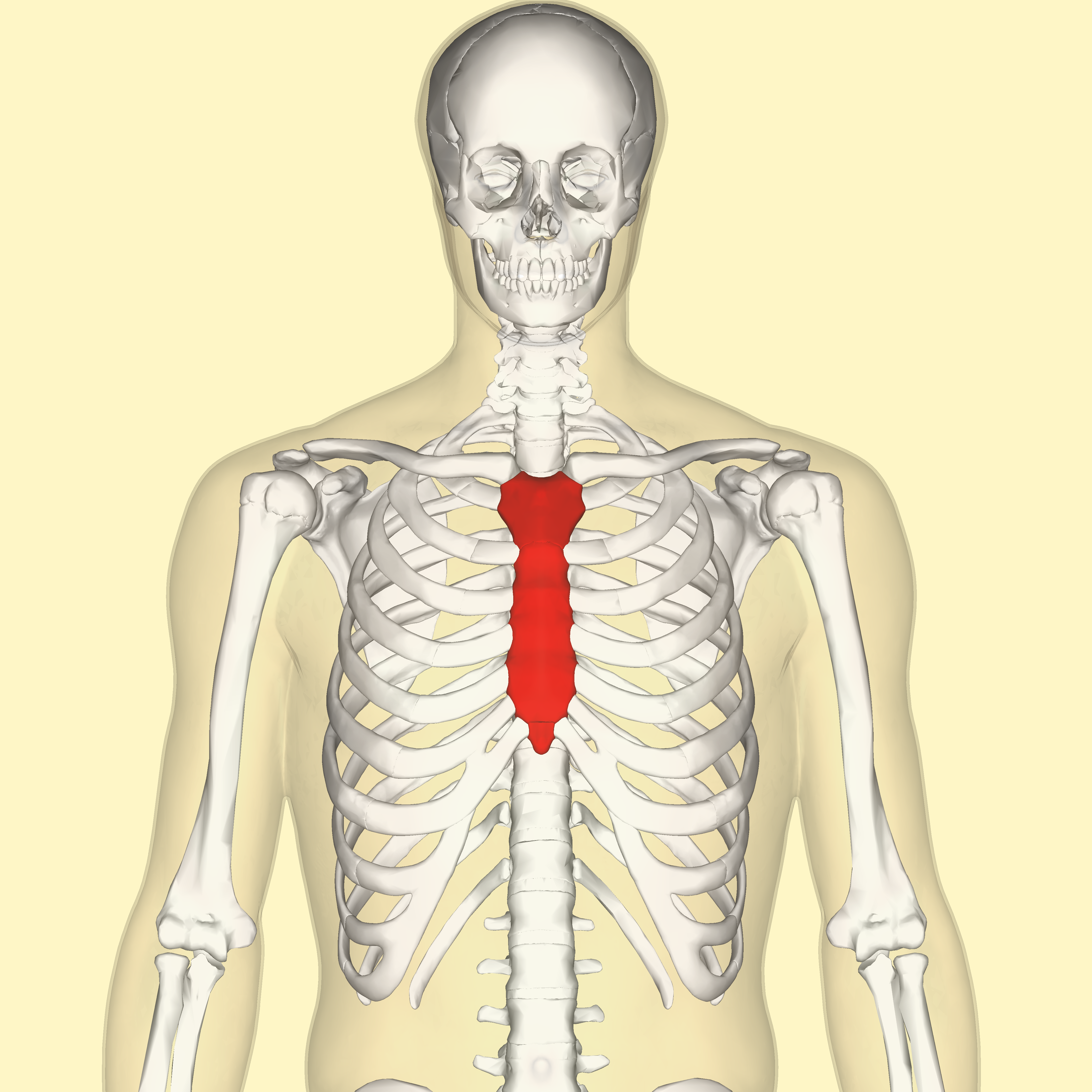
Heartburn is felt behind the sternum (red)

Heartburn is a burning sensation felt behind the breastbone, rising to the throat, and may be associated with an acidic taste. Heartburn is often associated with acid reflux or regurgitation. It is sometimes referred to as indigestion, sour stomach, acid regurgitation, or bitter belching. Heartburn is considered troublesome if mild symptoms occur two or more days a week, or moderate/severe symptoms are present at least once per week.

The sensation of heartburn often spreads to the neck, throat, or back and is commonly triggered by food. It tends to occur within an hour after eating, especially after a large meal. Lying down, especially after eating, can make heartburn worse. Some people find their symptoms more severe when lying on their right side. Nighttime heartburn can disrupt sleep and affect daily life. Activities that increase abdominal pressure, like bending, lifting heavy objects, or performing certain exercises, can also trigger symptoms. Studies suggest that stress and lack of sleep may make heartburn feel worse by increasing the body's sensitivity to symptoms.

== Differential diagnoses ==
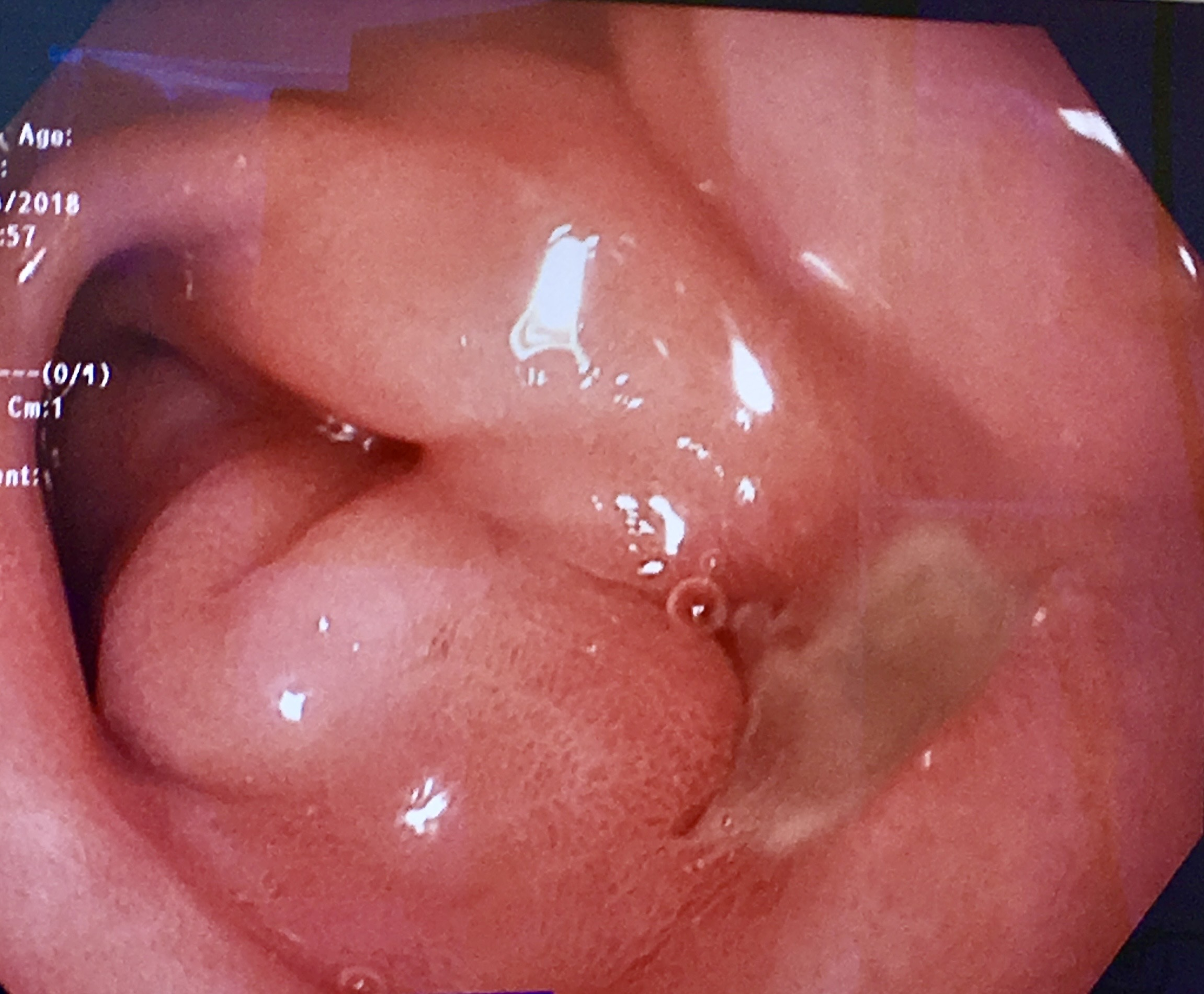
Peptic ulcer, a differential diagnosis for heartburn, in the gastric antrum

The differential diagnosis, a process used by healthcare professionals to help differentiate a diagnosis from other similar disorders, for heartburn includes motility disorders such as achalasia and gastroparesis; peptic ulcers; functional dyspepsia; angina; eosinophilic esophagitis; coronary artery disease; functional heartburn; peristalsis; acid reflux; inflammation of the esophagus (esophagitis), stomach (gastritis), pancreas (pancreatitis), gallbladder (cholecystitis), and duodenum (duodenitis); esophageal cancer; ischemic pain; hiatal hernia; biliary colic; stomach cancer; gallstones; pancreatic cancer; duodenal ulcer; and mesenteric adenitis. Heartburn can also be caused by certain medications such as nonsteroidal anti‐inflammatory drugs, corticosteroids, tetracycline antibiotics, bisphosphonates, calcium‐channel blockers, nitrates, tricyclic antidepressants, and anticholinergics.

== Pathophysiology ==
The exact causes of heartburn are not fully understood, but they likely involve multiple factors, including chemical irritation, pressure on the esophagus, and increased sensitivity to pain.

Acid reflux is a common cause of heartburn, but it is not the only etiology. A study in 1989 demonstrated this by giving participants acidic and basic solutions; the acidic solutions induced heartburn in all participants, though the more basic solution still invoked heartburn in over 40% of the participants. Ambulatory pH monitoring reveals that just a small percentage of acid reflux episodes trigger heartburn.

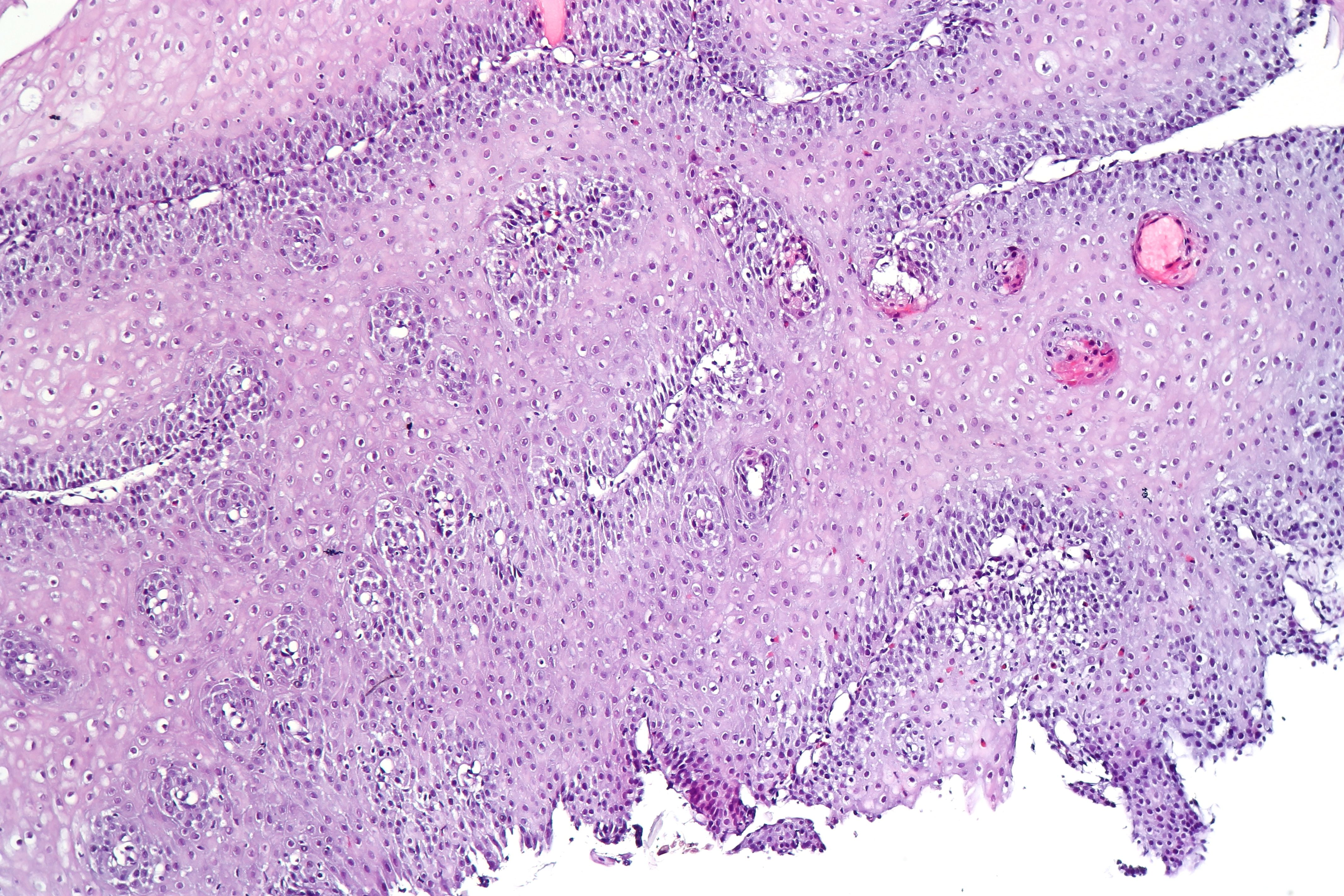
Esophagus with moderate GERD showing dilatation of intercellular spaces

Nerve endings and acid-sensitive ion channels in the deepest layer of the esophagus are usually protected by anatomical barriers. However, in gastroesophageal reflux disease (GERD), one of the earliest signs of damage is the development of dilated intercellular spaces in the esophageal lining. These spaces weaken the protective barrier, allowing acid and other substances to seep in. This triggers pain-sensitive nerves, which send signals to the brain and cause the sensation of heartburn.

Esophageal reflux can be classified as acidic (pH < 4), weakly acidic (pH 4–7), or non-acidic (pH > 7) using combined impedance–pH monitoring. Without proton-pump inhibitors (PPIs), heartburn symptoms are commonly linked to acid reflux, but about 15% of cases involve weakly acidic reflux. Factors like high reflux reach, low pH, large pH drops, high reflux volume, and slow acid clearance increase the likelihood of symptoms. When taking PPIs, heartburn may still occur, with 17–37% of cases linked to non-acidic, usually weakly acidic, reflux.

Bile acid rising into the esophagus can cause heartburn, though bile acid is slower and less intense than stomach acid exposure. The mechanism behind bile acid causing heartburn symptoms is thought to be due to bile damaging cell membranes and releasing intracellular mediators. Studies monitoring acid and bile reflux together show that they often occur simultaneously.

Mechanical stimulation may play a role in heartburn. Esophageal balloon distension, (Note: Esophageal balloon distension is a procedure used to evaluate esophageal chest pain.) especially in the upper esophagus, can trigger heartburn symptoms. This may be because the upper esophagus has more pressure-sensitive receptors than the lower esophagus. Acid exposure may also make these receptors more sensitive.

Esophageal hypersensitivity plays a major role in heartburn, especially in those with GERD who have normal acid levels. As shown in esophageal balloon studies, these individuals are also more sensitive to mechanical pressure. The likely cause is altered brain processing (central sensitization) rather than issues with esophageal receptors. Anxiety and stress can further heighten heartburn perception, both through brain mechanisms and possibly by weakening the esophageal lining (dilated intercellular spaces).

== Diagnostic approach ==
Diagnostic investigations for the evaluation of heartburn include endoscopy and esophageal pH monitoring. GERD is commonly diagnosed based on symptoms of heartburn or regurgitation. Endoscopy may be used to evaluate people who do not respond to treatment for heartburn or those with alarm symptoms such as persistent vomiting, gastrointestinal bleeding, iron-deficiency anemia, involuntary weight loss, difficult/painful swallowing (dysphagia, odynophagia), epigastric mass, family history of esophageal or gastric cancer, and new onset of symptoms in those older than 50 years of age.

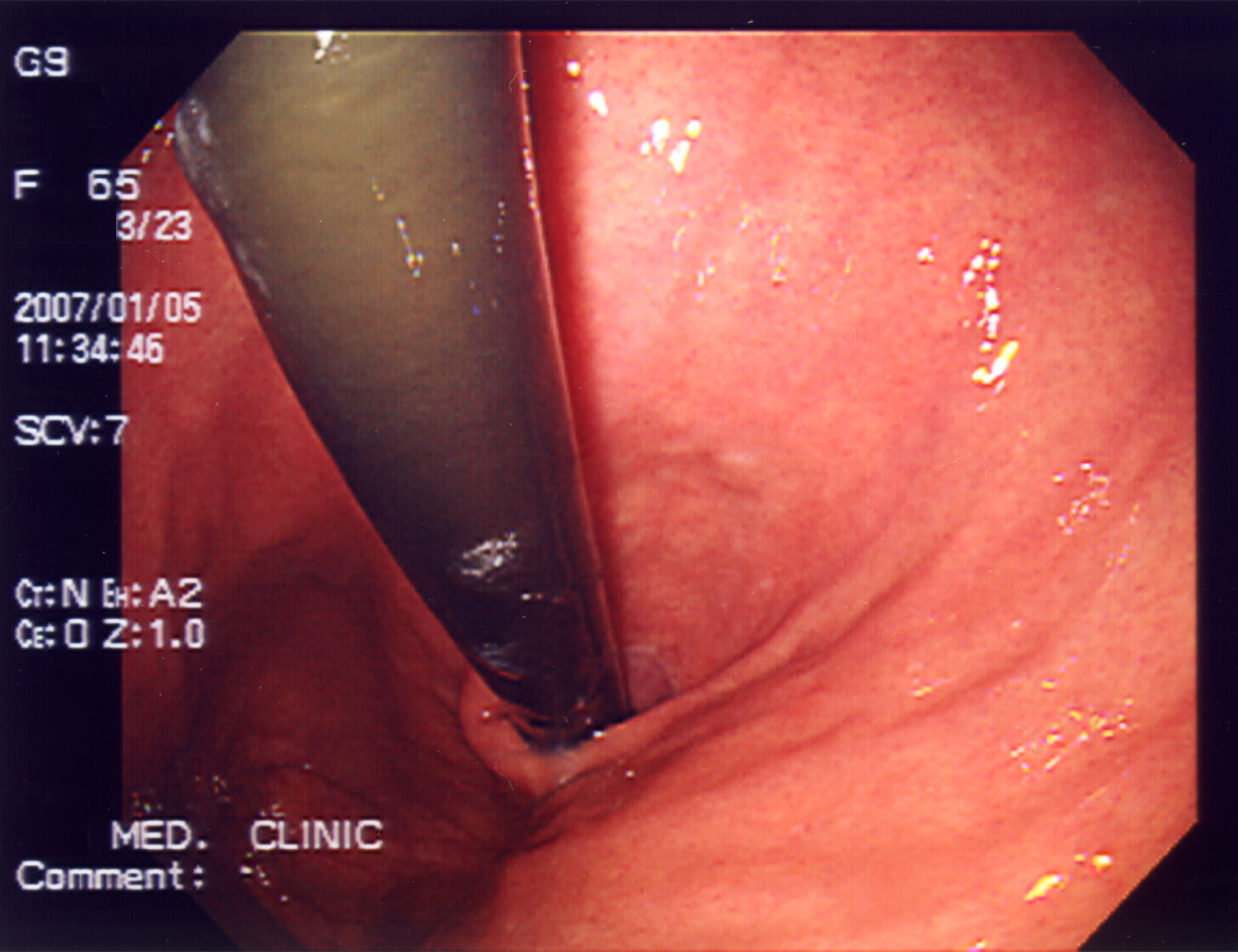
An endoscopy may be used to help find the cause of heartburn.

Endoscopy is a method used to detect abnormalities in the esophageal lining, such as erosive esophagitis and Barrett's esophagus. Biopsies taken during an endoscopy can help assess for other conditions linked to heartburn, such as eosinophilic and lymphocytic esophagitis. The esophageal 24-hour pH test or the multichannel intraluminal impedance-pH test is often performed in those with refractory heartburn who have undergone an endoscopy. High-resolution esophageal manometry (HREM) is the standard test for diagnosing esophageal motor disorders. It helps rule out major motility issues in those with persistent heartburn who have normal endoscopy and pH testing. Motility disorders include achalasia, esophagogastric junction outflow obstruction, diffuse esophageal spasm, jackhammer esophagus, and absent contractility. HREM can also distinguish GERD from conditions like rumination and supra-gastric belching. In some cases, gastric scintigraphy may be used to detect gastroparesis.

Functional heartburn is a burning feeling behind the breastbone, similar to GERD, but without signs of acid reflux, esophageal motor disorders, or mucosal damage on diagnostic tests like reflux monitoring, manometry, or endoscopy. After tests have been performed to rule out other causes of heartburn, functional heartburn is diagnosed according to diagnostic criteria:

1. Burning sensation or pain behind the chest.
2. Persistent symptoms despite effective acid-suppressing treatment.
3. No signs of GERD (Note: Increased acid exposure time or a strong link between reflux events and symptoms.) or eosinophilic esophagitis as the cause of symptoms.
4. No major oesophageal motility disorders present. (Note: Achalasia/EGJ outflow obstruction, diffuse esophageal spasm, jackhammer esophagus, and absent peristalsis)

To qualify as having a diagnosis of functional heartburn, an individual must meet all diagnostic criteria for the past three months, with symptoms appearing at least twice a week and beginning at least six months before the diagnosis.

== Treatment ==
Lifestyle changes such as losing weight and avoiding fatty, heavy, or spicy foods, particularly before bed, can improve symptoms. Over-the-counter alginates or antacids can be used on an as-needed basis to help with mild or intermittent heartburn. Individuals may aim to stop medications that can make heartburn worse. Physicians sometimes prescribe PPIs for four weeks to treat heartburn. H. pylori, if found, can be treated. If someone does not respond to a PPI, physicians may try H2 receptor antagonists. As a person's symptoms improve, physicians may decrease the frequency or dose of medications.

Many drugs have been used to treat heartburn, but antisecretory medications such as H2 receptor antagonists and PPIs have the most evidence for the treatment of heartburn. Low doses of tricyclic antidepressants and selective serotonin reuptake inhibitors may be used to manage functional heartburn.

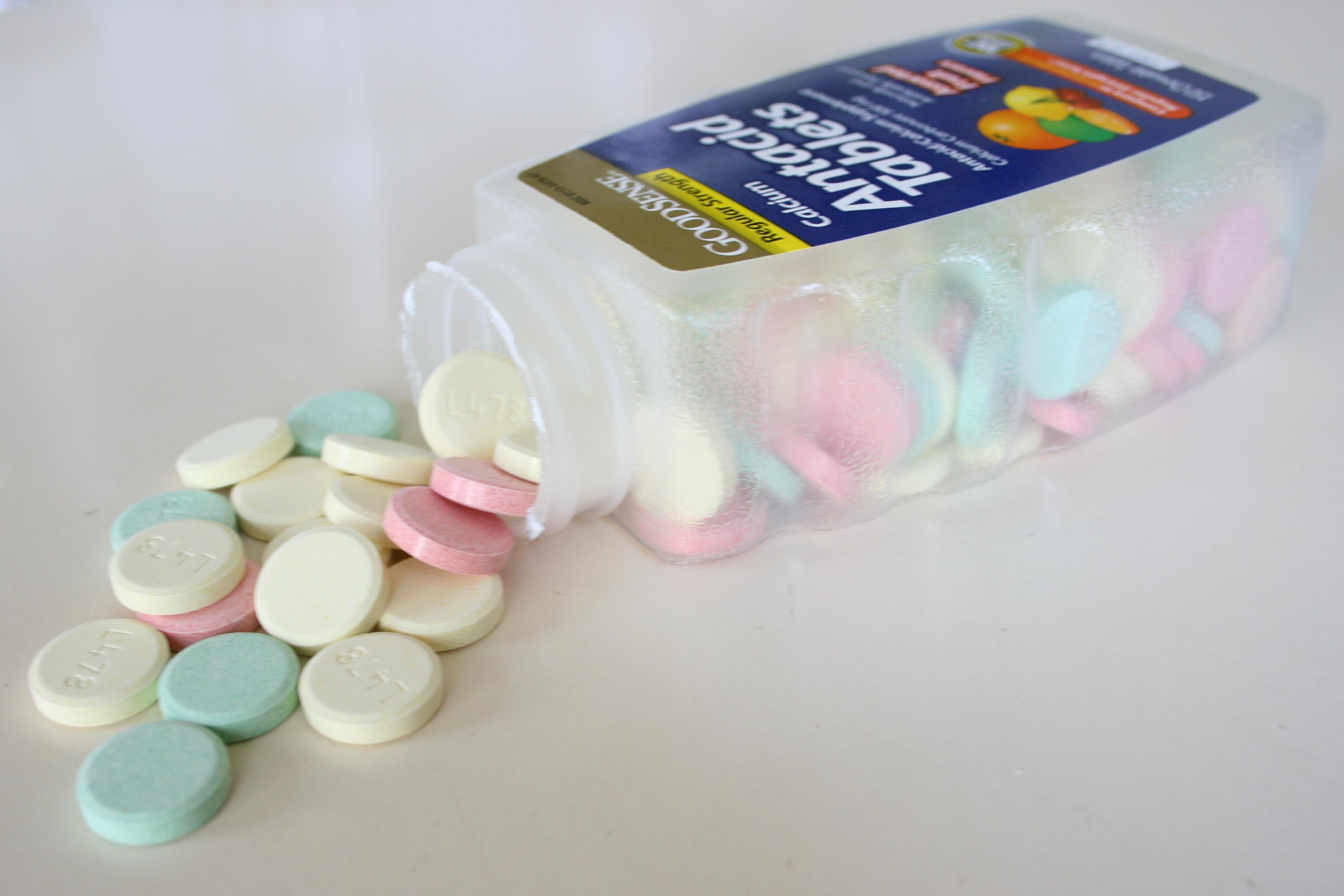
Antacids, such as the ones pictured, can be used to treat heartburn.

Antacids are fast-acting, short-term remedies for heartburn, made from compounds like aluminium hydroxide, magnesium hydroxide, and calcium carbonate, which neutralize acid. While still commonly used today, antacids were used more often before stronger acid-lowering drugs were discovered, mainly for occasional, post-meal heartburn or as needed. Alginate, extracted from seaweed and combined with sodium or potassium bicarbonate, is more effective than antacids for heartburn relief. In short-term GERD treatment (four weeks), alginate works as well as PPIs. It is also used as an add-on therapy for people whose symptoms do not fully resolve with PPIs, improving heartburn control and quality of life more than PPIs alone. H2RAs help lower stomach acid by blocking histamine at specific receptors in the stomach lining. Their effect lasts between four and eight hours, depending on the medication. They are mostly used for quick relief in people with mild acid reflux or as an additional treatment alongside PPIs, especially at night, since they are better at controlling nighttime acid levels.

PPIs reduce stomach acid by blocking an enzyme involved in its production (hydrogen potassium ATPase), and their effects last much longer than H2RAs—around 16 to 18 hours. They are stronger and do not lose effectiveness over time. However, they do not work immediately and do not fix the root cause of acid reflux; they simply make the refluxed contents less acidic. Potassium-competitive acid blockers (P-CABs) are a newer type of acid-reducing medication that works by blocking the hydrogen potassium ATPase. Vonoprazan is the most researched P-CAB and is just as effective as PPIs in healing esophagitis and preventing relapses. In more severe cases, it may work even better than PPIs. However, P-CABs have not been more effective than a placebo for treating symptoms in people with nonerosive reflux disease, (Note: Symptoms related to acid reflux—such as heartburn or regurgitation—despite there being no visible damage to the esophagus when checked by endoscopy) likely because this condition includes a mix of different underlying issues.

Prokinetics help clear stomach acid from the esophagus by improving muscle movement and speeding up stomach emptying, which can be slow in some people with GERD. Common prokinetics include metoclopramide, domperidone, mosapride, itopride, and prucalopride. Since GERD can be a motility issue, these drugs have the potential to address its root cause. However, there is no strong evidence that they effectively treat GERD. They are usually added to PPI treatment for those whose heartburn does not improve with PPIs alone, but their effectiveness in this case is unclear. Baclofen is a GABA agonist that helps reduce reflux by decreasing the relaxation of the lower esophageal sphincter, which is one of the main causes of GERD. However, its use is limited and is usually considered only as an add-on treatment for individuals with persistent heartburn despite taking PPIs.

== Epidemiology ==
About 25% of people experience heartburn at least once a month, while 12% have it at least once a week. Clinically significant heartburn affects about 6% of the American population. Most people do not see heartburn as a serious medical issue and rarely seek medical help for it. A survey in Olmsted County, Minnesota, found that only 5.4% of participants with heartburn had addressed their heartburn with a doctor in the past year, even though their symptoms were moderately severe and had lasted for over five years.

== History ==
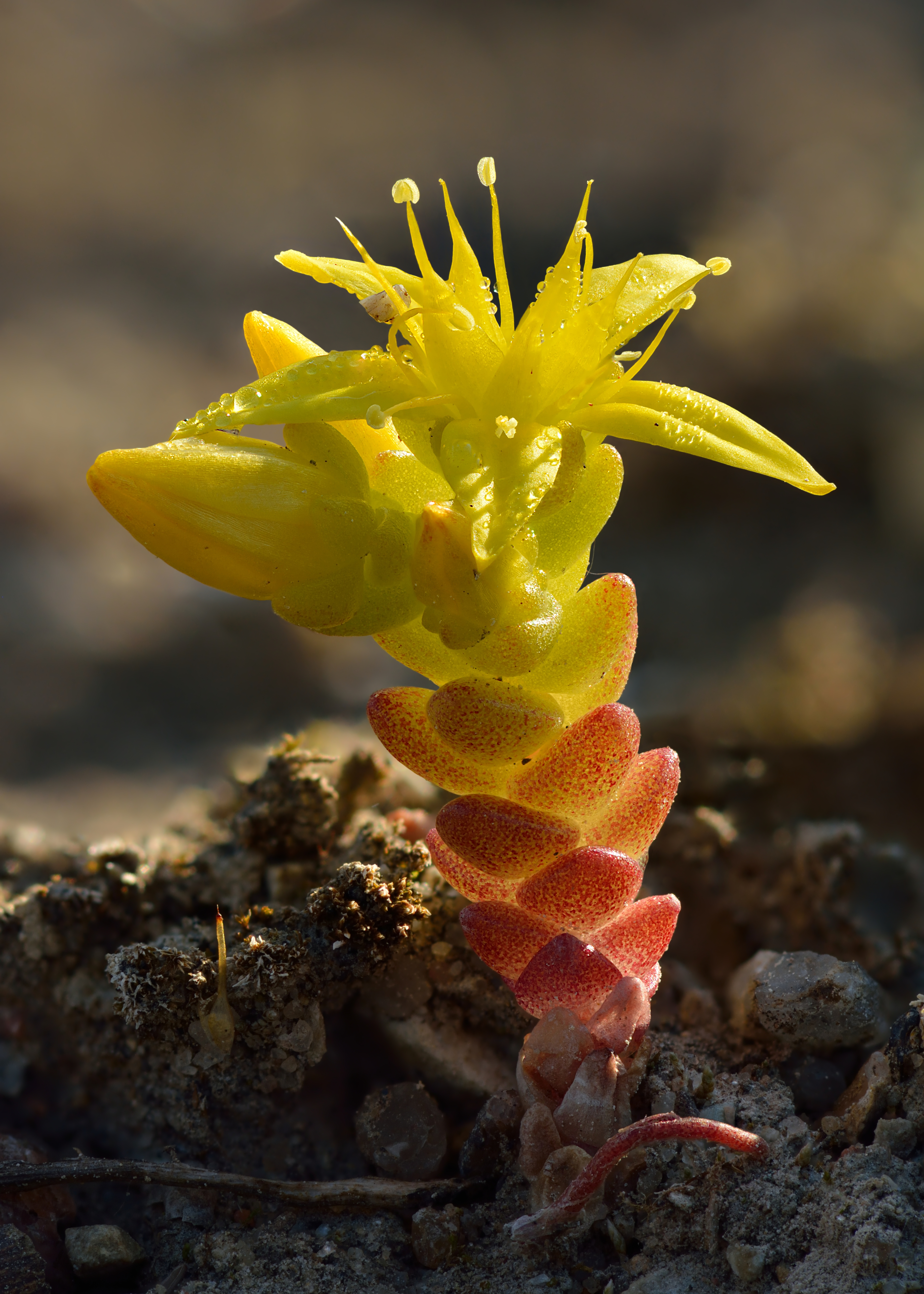
Stonecrop, a plant historically used for the treatment of heartburn

Heartburn has often been associated with intense emotions, such as anger or distress. This belief was challenged as early as 1591 when the term hartburning was used to describe epigastric irritation. Shakespeare described heartburn in his play The Tragedy of Richard the Third as "A long-continues drudge and heart burning between the Queens kindred and the King's blood". (Note: Original text: "A long continued grudge and hearte brennynge betwene the Quenes kinred and the kinges blood".) Historical descriptions of heartburn from the 1500s to the 1700s include "a sharpness, soreness of the stomach, heartburning" (Note: Original text: "a sharpnes, sowernes of stomack, hartburning") and "a sharp gnawing pain at the orifice of the stomach". Throughout the 1500s to the 1800s, stonecrop, chewed green tea, and chalk or magnesia were reportedly used by some as remedies for heartburn.

Because the pain was felt in the chest and the focus was on the heart at the time, doctors initially believed heartburn came from the heart rather than the esophagus. This is why the terms cardialgia or cardialgy were first used to describe heartburn. Symptoms of heartburn were also attributed to the consumption of "poor quality food".

Throughout the 1700s to the 1800s, many different terms were used to describe acid reflux. An English dictionary from the mid-1700s defined cardialgia as "from cardia, the heart, or rather the left orifice of the stomach, and -algia, to be pained, the pain of the mouth of the stomach or heart-burn".

Throughout history, the terms cardialgia, heartburn, pyrosis, dyspepsia, and indigestion were often used interchangeably, and there was little advancement in differentiating the terms till the 1900s.

== In pregnancy ==
Heartburn is common in pregnancy, with the incidence ranging between 17% and 45%. Complications related to heartburn in pregnancy are rare, meaning that diagnostic tests such as upper endoscopy are usually not required, and the diagnosis can be made based on symptoms. Heartburn usually resolves after delivery.

Many different factors lead to the development of heartburn during pregnancy. Hormonal changes, such as higher levels of progesterone, can cause relaxation of the smooth muscles, which lowers stomach tone and motility and reduces pressure in the lower esophageal sphincter. During pregnancy, the lower esophageal sphincter moves into the chest cavity, where pressure is lower. This makes it easier for stomach acid and food to flow back into the esophagus, causing irritation and a burning sensation. Other factors that can cause heartburn during pregnancy include increased pressure on the stomach from the uterus, weight gain, changes in gastric emptying, delayed small bowel transit, or medications.

== See also ==
- Abdominal angina – Abdominal pain
- Laryngopharyngeal reflux – Flow of stomach contents into the throat (larynx and pharynx)

== Works cited ==
- "Acid Reflux & GERD: What To Know". Cleveland Clinic. August 31, 2023.
- Ali, Raja Affendi Raja; Hassan, Jamiyah; Egan, Laurence J. (December 2022). "Review of recent evidence on the management of heartburn in pregnant and breastfeeding women". BMC Gastroenterology. 22 (1). Springer Science and Business Media: 219. doi:10.1186/s12876-022-02287-w. ISSN 1471-230X. PMC 9066781. PMID 35508989.
- Argüero, Julieta; Sifrim, Daniel (April 2024). "Pathophysiology of gastro-oesophageal reflux disease: implications for diagnosis and management". Nature Reviews Gastroenterology & Hepatology. 21 (4). Springer Science and Business Media: 282–293. doi:10.1038/s41575-023-00883-z. ISSN 1759-5045. PMID 38177402.
- Barish, Charles F.; Castell, Donald O.; Richter, Joel E. (December 1986). "Graded esophageal balloon distention: A new provocative test for noncardiac chest pain". Digestive Diseases and Sciences. 31 (12). Springer Science and Business Media: 1292–1298. doi:10.1007/BF01299805. ISSN 0163-2116. PMID 3803130.
- Basnayake, Chamara; Geeraerts, Annelies; Pauwels, Ans; Koek, Ger; Vaezi, Michael; Vanuytsel, Tim; Tack, Jan (September 2021). "Systematic review: duodenogastroesophageal (biliary) reflux prevalence, symptoms, oesophageal lesions and treatment". Alimentary Pharmacology & Therapeutics. 54 (6). Wiley: 755–778. doi:10.1111/apt.16533. ISSN 0269-2813. PMID 34313333.
- Benson, Brian; Din-Lovinescu, Corina; Farooq, Muhammad (2020). "A Brief History of Reflux Disease". Laryngopharyngeal and Gastroesophageal Reflux. Springer International Publishing. pp. 61–70. doi:10.1007/978-3-030-48890-1_8. ISBN 978-3-030-48889-5.
- Buchan, Jessica (May 2, 2016). "Heartburn and dyspepsia". Essential Primary Care. Wiley. pp. 170–176. doi:10.1002/9781394322138.ch19. ISBN 978-1-394-32213-8.
- Cook, Chad E.; Décary, Simon (January 2020). "Higher order thinking about differential diagnosis". Brazilian Journal of Physical Therapy. 24 (1). Elsevier: 1–7. doi:10.1016/j.bjpt.2019.01.010. ISSN 1413-3555. PMC 6994315. PMID 30723033.
- DeVault, Kenneth R. (September 2, 2016). "Heartburn, Regurgitation, and Chest Pain". Practical Gastroenterology and Hepatology Board Review Toolkit. Wiley. pp. 46–51. doi:10.1002/9781119127437.ch8. ISBN 978-1-118-82906-6.
- Domingues, Gerson; Moraes-Filho, Joaquim Prado P.; Fass, Ronnie (March 2018). "Refractory Heartburn: A Challenging Problem in Clinical Practice". Digestive Diseases and Sciences. 63 (3). Springer Science and Business Media: 577–582. doi:10.1007/s10620-018-4927-5. ISSN 0163-2116. PMID 29352757.
- Fass, Ronnie; Boeckxstaens, Guy E.; El-Serag, Hashem; Rosen, Rachel; Sifrim, Daniel; Vaezi, Michael F. (July 29, 2021). "Gastro-oesophageal reflux disease". Nature Reviews Disease Primers. 7 (1). Springer Science and Business Media: 55. doi:10.1038/s41572-021-00287-w. ISSN 2056-676X. PMID 34326345.
- Garg, Vandana; Narang, Prashant; Taneja, Ritu (March 2022). "Antacids revisited: review on contemporary facts and relevance for self-management". Journal of International Medical Research. 50 (3). SAGE Publications: 1–22. doi:10.1177/03000605221086457. ISSN 0300-0605. PMC 8966100. PMID 35343261.
- Modlin, Irvin M; Kidd, Mark; Lye, Kevin D (2003). "Historical perspectives on the treatment of gastroesophageal reflux disease". Gastrointestinal Endoscopy Clinics of North America. 13 (1). Elsevier: 19–55. doi:10.1016/S1052-5157(02)00104-6. ISSN 1052-5157. PMID 12797425.
- Fass, Ronnie; Zerbib, Frank; Gyawali, C. Prakash (June 2020). "AGA Clinical Practice Update on Functional Heartburn: Expert Review". Gastroenterology. 158 (8). Elsevier: 2286–2293. doi:10.1053/j.gastro.2020.01.034. ISSN 0016-5085. PMID 32017911.
- Makowsky, Mark (2019). "Heartburn". Patient Assessment in Clinical Pharmacy. Springer International Publishing. pp. 107–120. doi:10.1007/978-3-030-11775-7_9. ISBN 978-3-030-11774-0.
- Patel, Dhyanesh; Fass, Ronnie; Vaezi, Michael (July 2021). "Untangling Nonerosive Reflux Disease From Functional Heartburn". Clinical Gastroenterology and Hepatology. 19 (7). Elsevier: 1314–1326. doi:10.1016/j.cgh.2020.03.057. ISSN 1542-3565. PMID 32246998.
- Poitras, P.; Bouin, M. (2022). "Esophageal Symptoms: Heartburn, Dysphagia, and Chest Pain". The Digestive System: From Basic Sciences to Clinical Practice. Springer International Publishing. pp. 307–310. doi:10.1007/978-3-030-98381-9_9. ISBN 978-3-030-98380-2.
- Rameau, Anaïs; Mudry, Albert (October 2020). "When did gastro-esophageal reflux become a disease? A historical perspective on GER(D) nomenclature". International Journal of Pediatric Otorhinolaryngology. 137 110214. Elsevier. doi:10.1016/j.ijporl.2020.110214. ISSN 0165-5876. PMID 32658809.
- Roman, Sabine (2020). "Gastro-esophageal reflux disorders". Clinical and Basic Neurogastroenterology and Motility. Elsevier. pp. 225–236. doi:10.1016/b978-0-12-813037-7.00015-7. ISBN 978-0-12-813037-7.
- "Rome IV Criteria". Rome Foundation. February 7, 2025.
- Savarino, Vincenzo; Marabotto, Elisa; Zentilin, Patrizia; De Bortoli, Nicola; Visaggi, Pierfrancesco; Furnari, Manuele; Bodini, Giorgia; Giannini, Edoardo; Savarino, Edoardo (July 21, 2023). "How safe are heartburn medications and who should use them?". Expert Opinion on Drug Safety. 22 (8). Informa UK Limited: 643–652. doi:10.1080/14740338.2023.2238592. ISSN 1474-0338. PMID 37477199.
- Smith, J. L.; Opekun, A. R.; Larkai, E.; Graham, D. Y. (February 1989). "Sensitivity of the esophageal mucosa to pH in gastroesophageal reflux disease". Gastroenterology. 96 (3). Elsevier: 683–689. doi:10.1016/S0016-5085(89)80065-4. ISSN 0016-5085. PMID 2914634.
- Spechler, Stuart Jon (April 2020). "Refractory Gastroesophageal Reflux Disease and Functional Heartburn". Gastrointestinal Endoscopy Clinics of North America. 30 (2). Elsevier: 343–359. doi:10.1016/j.giec.2019.12.003. ISSN 1052-5157. PMID 32146950.
- Spechler, Stuart Jon; Souza, Rhonda F. (March 2021). "Evaluation and Management of Patients with PPI-Refractory Heartburn". Current Treatment Options in Gastroenterology. 19 (1). Springer Science and Business Media: 134–152. doi:10.1007/s11938-020-00327-6. ISSN 1092-8472.
- Stein, Peter H. (2020). "GERD: Differential Diagnosis and Related Diseases". Laryngopharyngeal and Gastroesophageal Reflux. Springer International Publishing. pp. 209–213. doi:10.1007/978-3-030-48890-1_23. ISBN 978-3-030-48889-5.
- Sawada, Akinari; Sifrim, Daniel; Fujiwara, Yasuhiro (November 15, 2023). "Esophageal Reflux Hypersensitivity: A Comprehensive Review". Gut and Liver. 17 (6). The Editorial Office of Gut and Liver: 831–842. doi:10.5009/gnl220373. ISSN 1976-2283. PMC 10651372. PMID 36588526.
- Vazquez, Juan C. (September 8, 2015). "Heartburn in pregnancy". BMJ Clinical Evidence. 2015. BMJ: 1411. ISSN 1752-8526. PMC 4562453. PMID 26348641.
- Zikos, Thomas A.; Clarke, John O. (September 2020). "Non-acid Reflux: When It Matters and Approach to Management". Current Gastroenterology Reports. 22 (9). Springer Science and Business Media: 43. doi:10.1007/s11894-020-00780-4. ISSN 1522-8037. PMID 32651702.
