= AEN =

AEN may refer to:

- Acute esophageal necrosis, a rare esophageal disorder
- A+E Networks, a media organization based in the US
- AEN Ayiou Georgiou Vrysoullon-Acheritou, an association football club in the Agios Georgios refugee settlement in Cyprus
- Alliance for Europe of the Nations, a defunct European political party
- Alfred E. Neuman, a fictional character in MAD magazine
- Armenian Environmental Network
- Armenian Sign Language
- Asynchronous event notification in (for example) the NC-SI electrical interface
- AEN (group), a South Korean-Japanese boy group
