= UrgentRx =

American pharmaceutical manufacturer

- Industry: Consumer packaged goods Pharmaceuticals
- Founded: 2010
- Fate: Acquired (2015)
- Headquarters: Denver, Colorado
- Key people: Jordan Eisenberg President and Founder; Mike Valentino, Chairman of the Board
- Website: UrgentRx.com

UrgentRx is a Denver, Colorado-based pharmaceutical manufacturer. The company was founded in 2010 by Jordan Eisenberg.

UrgentRx makes a line of flavored, powdered, single-dose OTC medications that are flavored and powdered. UrgentRx was initially developed as a way for potential heart attack victims to carry aspirin with them. The company now makes medications for other ailments such as headaches, aches and pains, allergic reactions, heartburn, and upset stomach.

In July 2013 UrgentRx named Michael Valentino to the company's board.

== History ==
UrgentRx was founded in 2010 by Jordan Eisenberg in Denver, Colorado. The company launched its first product three years later. Eisenberg developed single-serve, dissolving powdered medications for common ailments like headaches or upset stomachs, packaged in small, credit-card-sized foil packets.

In November 2015, UrgentRx was acquired by Synergy CHC Corporation.
