= Esophageal disease =

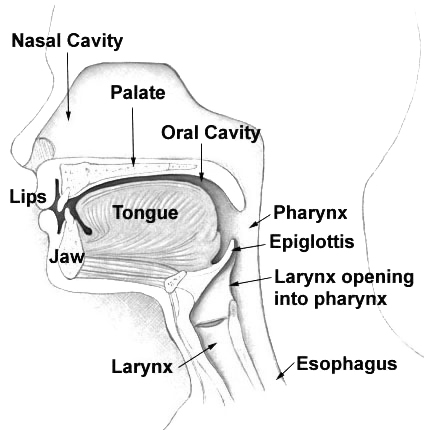
- Head and neck. Esophagus at bottom.
- Specialty: Gastroenterology

Esophageal diseases can derive from congenital conditions, or they can be acquired later in life.

Many people experience a burning sensation in their chest occasionally, caused by stomach acids refluxing into the esophagus, normally called heartburn. Extended exposure to heartburn may erode the lining of the esophagus, leading potentially to Barrett's esophagus which is associated with an increased risk of adenocarcinoma most commonly found in the distal one-third of the esophagus.

Some people also experience a sensation known as globus esophagus, where it feels as if a ball is lodged in the lower part of the esophagus.

The following are additional diseases and conditions that affect the esophagus:

- Achalasia
- Acute esophageal necrosis
- Barrett's esophagus
- Boerhaave syndrome
- Caustic injury to the esophagus
- Chagas disease
- Diffuse esophageal spasm
- Esophageal atresia and tracheoesophageal fistula
- Esophageal cancer
- Esophageal dysphagia
- Esophageal varices
- Esophageal web
- Esophagitis
- GERD
- Hiatus hernia
- Killian–Jamieson diverticulum
- Mallory–Weiss syndrome
- Neurogenic dysphagia
- Nutcracker esophagus
- Schatzki's ring
- Zenker's diverticulum
