= Esophagogastric junction outflow obstruction =

- Other names: EGJOO
- Specialty: Gastroenterology
- Symptoms: Asymptomatic, dysphagia, chest pain
- Usual onset: 56-57 years
- Types: Mechanical, functional, medication, artifact
- Risk factors: Female gender, overweight
- Diagnostic method: High resolution manometry (esophageal manometry)
- Differential diagnosis: Achalasia
- Treatment: Pneumatic dilation, Per-oral endoscopic myotomy (POEM), botulinum toxin injection
- Prognosis: Depends on etiology
- Frequency: Unknown

Esophagogastric junction outflow obstruction (EGJOO) is an esophageal motility disorder characterized by increased pressure where the esophagus connects to the stomach at the lower esophageal sphincter. EGJOO is diagnosed by esophageal manometry. However, EGJOO has a variety of etiologies; evaluating the cause of obstruction with additional testing, such as upper endoscopy, computed tomography (CT imaging), or endoscopic ultrasound may be necessary. When possible, treatment of EGJOO should be directed at the cause of obstruction. When no cause for obstruction is found (functional EGJOO), observation alone may be considered if symptoms are minimal. Functional EGJOO with significant or refractory symptoms may be treated with pneumatic dilation, per-oral endoscopic myotomy (POEM), or botulinum toxin injection.

== Types ==
EGJOO may be broadly categorized into 4 subgroups: mechanical, functional, medication-related, and artifact.

== Signs and symptoms ==
In some cases, EGJOO may cause no symptoms, and the manometry findings are identified during an evaluation prior to anti-reflux surgery. In other cases, EGJOO may be identified after an evaluation for esophageal symptoms. The most common symptoms are dysphagia (50-75%), typical reflux (29-67%), atypical reflux (21-36%), chest pain (16-46%), abdominal pain (43%) or regurgitation (38%). One study suggested about 5% of individuals have no symptoms.

== Causes ==
Several causes for EGJOO exist. Etiologies include early achalasia, mechanical processes (eosinophilic esophagitis, hiatal hernia, strictures, etc.), esophageal wall thickness (fibrosis, cancer, etc.), compression by nearby blood vessels (external vascular compression), obesity, opioid medication effect, or anatomic abnormalities. The findings associated with EGJOO may be falsely abnormal due to measurement errors.

== Diagnosis ==
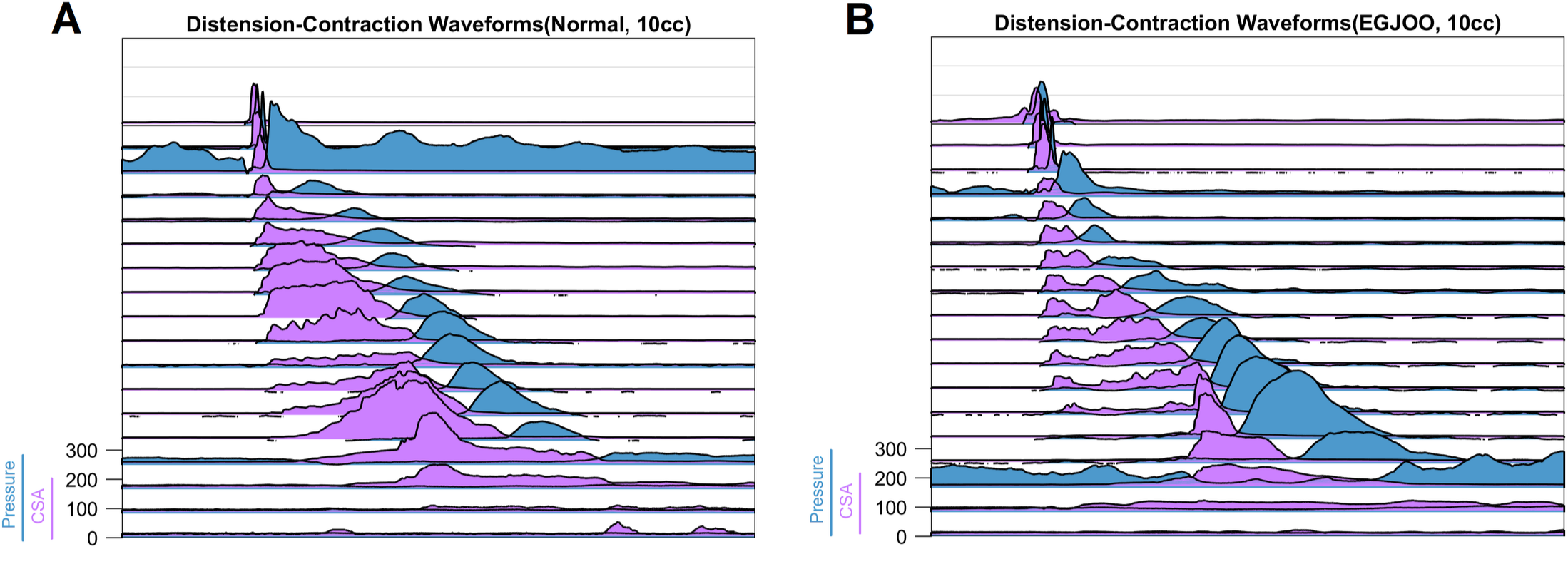
Normal in (A). EGJOO in (B). Pressure waves in blue. Cross-sectional areas CSA) in fucsia.

EGJOO is diagnosed using esophageal manometry. High resolution esophageal manometry will show elevated pressure at the LES with normal peristalsis. The LES pressure is evaluated immediately following a swallow, when the sphincter should relax. The overall LES pressure after a swallow is represented by the integrated relaxation pressure (IRP). If the IRP is abnormally elevated (>15 mmHg), this indicates an obstruction is present. Normal peristalsis with an obstruction at the esophagogastric junction (elevated IRP) is consistent with EGJOO.

Upper endoscopy is used to evaluate for mechanical causes of obstruction. Endoscopic findings may include a hiatal hernia, esophagitis, strictures, tumors, or masses. Increased pressure at the LES over time may result in an epiphrenic diverticulum. Further evaluation for mechanical causes of obstruction may include CT scans, MRI, or endoscopic ultrasound.

Several additional tests may be used to further evaluate EGJOO. Further evaluation of esophageal motor function may be accomplished with functional lumen imaging probe (FLIP). Although not widely available, FLIP may help assess esophageal wall stiffness and compliance. FLIP may help identify individuals with EGJOO who are likely to benefit from therapeutic procedures.

Timed barium esophagram can help distinguish EGJOO from untreated achalasia.

== Treatment ==
Treatment primarily consists of addressing the underlying cause of EGJOO. For example, gastroesophageal reflux disease (GERD) with reflux esophagitis is treated with proton pump inhibitors. Esophageal rings or strictures may be treated with esophageal dilation.

Simple observation may be considered, especially if symptoms are minimal or absent. If symptoms are severe or persistent, peroral endoscopic myotomy (POEM) may be offered.

Pneumatic dilation may be used for persistent symptoms in the absence of identified causes of mechanical obstruction. Botulinum toxin may be considered, especially for individuals who are unlikely to tolerate surgery.

== Prognosis ==
The prognosis for EGJOO depends on the etiology of obstruction. In the absence of anatomic or mechanical causes, such as cancer, outcomes are generally favorable. Individuals with minimal or no symptoms often experience resolution of the EGJOO, even without treatment.

== Epidemiology ==
The overall prevalence of EGJOO is unclear. The prevalence of EGJOO among all patients undergoing high resolution manometry was up to 10 percent. The diagnostic criteria were later adjusted to distinguish relevant (symptomatic) EGJOO from isolated manometric findings of EGJOO without symptoms.

Individuals diagnosed with EGJOO based on Chicago 3.0 classification have an average age of 56–57 years. EGJOO more commonly affects women (51-88%). The average BMI is between 25 and 30.
