= Esophageal stricture =

Tightening of the esophagus leading to difficulty swallowing

- Other names: Peptic stricture
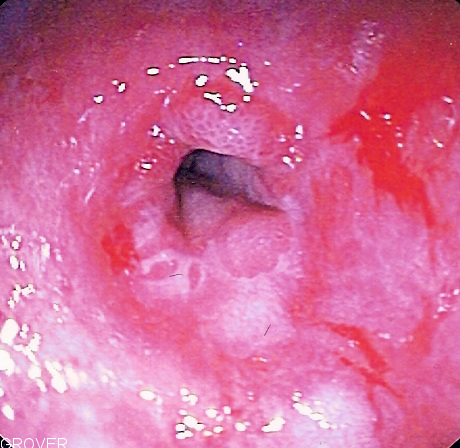
- Endoscopic image of a benign peptic stricture
- Specialty: Gastroenterology; General surgery

A benign esophageal stricture, or peptic stricture, is a narrowing or tightening of the esophagus that causes swallowing difficulties.

== Signs and symptoms ==
Symptoms of esophageal strictures include heartburn, bitter or acid taste in the mouth, choking, coughing, shortness of breath, frequent burping or hiccups, pain or trouble swallowing, throwing up blood, or weight loss.

== Causes ==
It can be caused by or associated with gastroesophageal reflux disease, esophagitis, a dysfunctional lower esophageal sphincter, disordered motility, lye ingestion, or a hiatal hernia. Strictures can form after esophageal surgery and other treatments such as laser therapy or photodynamic therapy. While the area heals, a scar forms, causing the tissue to pull and tighten, leading to difficulty in swallowing.

== Diagnosis ==
It can be diagnosed with an X-ray while the patient swallows barium (called a barium study of the esophagus), by a computerized tomography scan, a biopsy, or by an endoscopy.

== Treatment ==
If it is caused by esophagitis, in turn caused by an underlying infection, it is commonly treated by treating the infection (typically with antibiotics). In order to open the stricture, a surgeon can insert a bougie – a weighted tube used to dilate the constricted areas in the esophagus. It can sometimes be treated with other medications. For example, an H2 antagonist (e.g. ranitidine) or a proton-pump inhibitor (e.g. omeprazole) can treat underlying acid reflux disease.

== Epidemiology ==
Gastroesophageal reflux disease (GERD) affects approximately 40% of adults. Strictures occur in 7–23% of patients with GERD who are untreated.

== See also ==
- Esophageal cancer
- Esophageal diseases
- Esophageal spasm
- Helicobacter pylori
