= Anorectal manometry =

Medical functional test of the anus and rectum

- OPS-301 code: 1-315

Anorectal manometry (ARM) is a medical test used to measure pressures in the anus and rectum and to assess their function. The test is performed by inserting a catheter, that contains a probe embedded with pressure sensors, through the anus and into the rectum. Patients may be asked to perform certain maneuvers, such as coughing or attempting to defecate, to assess for pressure changes. Anorectal manometry is a safe and low risk procedure.

From 2014 to 2018, the international anorectal physiology working group (IAPWG) meet several times to develop consensus on indications for anorectal manometry. Their assessment concluded that anorectal manometry was indicated when used in assessment of fecal incontinence, constipation, evacuation disorders (including Hirschsprung's disease), functional anorectal pain and in the assessment of anorectal function preoperatively or after a traumatic obstetric injury. In addition to the indications outlined by the IAPWG, anorectal manometry has been used as a component of anorectal biofeedback.

Since its introduction in 2007, high resolution anorectal manometry (HR-ARM) has increasingly replaced conventional anorectal manometry as the standard. There has been increasing usage of high-definition (3D) anorectal manometry (HD-ARM) as well. Current advances in anorectal manometry include the development of bedside portable technology.

== Medical uses ==
=== Fecal incontinence ===
After eliminating structural causes of fecal incontinence from the differential diagnosis, anorectal manometry may be used to evaluate deficiencies in sphincter function or anorectal sensation. An abnormal resting pressure or squeeze pressure may indicate problems with either the internal anal sphincter or the external anal sphincter respectively. Both increased and decreased anorectal sensation has also been detected in individuals with fecal incontinence. The use of HD-ARM can allow recognition of pressure asymmetry within the anorectum. Some patients with fecal incontinence benefit from muscle strength training which may make use of anorectal biofeedback.

=== Constipation ===
Anorectal manometry can be used in the diagnostic workup of individuals with chronic constipation without a known cause or with chronic constipation that has not improved on a trial of laxatives and/or fiber. For example, on a digital rectal exam, a physician may notice specific findings that point to dyssynergic defecation, a cause of chronic constipation. In such instances, the physician may order an anorectal manometry study to verify their findings. Abnormal results, such as the presence of a paradoxical contraction of the anal sphincter muscles during defecation (i.e. the muscles are squeezing instead of relaxing), can also be used to guide treatment (e.g. anorectal biofeedback). Other abnormal findings on manometry consistent with chronic constipation include an unsatisfactory generation of the propulsive force needed to defecate and a decreased movement of pelvic floor muscles.

Anorectal manometry, especially HR-ARM and HD-ARM, has also been used to evaluate constipation due to structural causes such as a rectocele, an enterocele, or an intra-anal intussusception.

=== Hirschsprung's disease ===
In infants and children, anorectal manometry may be used to assist in the diagnosis of Hirschsprung's disease. The absence of the rectoanal inhibitory reflex (RAIR) is almost always pathognomonic for Hirschsprung's disease in this population. Anorectal manometry is not significantly less sensitive and specific when compared to the gold standard method of diagnosis, rectal suction biopsy. In adults, the absence of the RAIR is less likely due to Hirschsprung's disease and may indicate the presence of megarectum.

=== Functional anorectal pain ===
Functional anorectal pain includes disorders such as levator ani syndrome, proctalgia fugax and unspecified functional anorectal syndrome. Although diagnosis of these disorders is largely clinical, anorectal manometry may be used for further diagnostic assessment. For example, the degree of anal sphincter hypertension may be determined which may be useful information when treating functional anorectal pain with biofeedback therapy.

=== Biofeedback ===
The goal of anorectal biofeedback is to help patients improve defecating behaviors by providing patients with visual and verbal feedback. Visual feedback tools, such as anorectal manometry, are often used to aid patients in learning how to modify their behaviors. Patients may work on improving muscle strength, muscle relaxation or sensation during defecation.

The effectiveness of anorectal biofeedback as a treatment remains an ongoing source of debate and research. A systemic review article concluded that although better than placebo, there remained limited evidence demonstrating the effectiveness of anorectal biofeedback for chronic idiopathic constipation. In patients with defecatory disorders, including dyssynergic defecation, pelvic floor biofeedback therapy had been shown to be more effective than laxatives. An American-European Neurogastroenterology & Motility task force (ANMS-ESNM) recommended the use of biofeedback in the short and long treatment of constipation with dyssynergic defecation and fecal incontinence. They did not recommend biofeedback treatment for constipation without dyssynergic defecation, nor in children with constipation.

== Types ==
Types of anorectal manometry include:

- Non-high resolution (conventional) manometry (non-HRM)
- High resolution anorectal manometry (HR-ARM)
- High-definition anorectal manometry (HD-ARM or 3D-ARM)

HR-ARM and HD-ARM are newer methods that use multiple closely spaced sensors in the anus and rectum, compared to 3-6 widely spaced sensors used by non-HRM, to generate a more refined view. An additional benefit to HR-ARM and HD-ARM is the increased ease in analyzing the results as pressure readings are displayed in both color and as a line plot. Accompanying the benefits shared by both high-resolution and high-definition methods, the HD-ARM method employs additional sensors placed circumferentially around the catheter allowing for closer interpretation of individual sensor pressure readings. In comparison to non-HRM, however, both of the newer methods utilize equipment that is more expensive and has a shorter design life.

== Procedure ==
=== Equipment ===
The specifics of the equipment used for the procedure will ultimately depend on the type of manometry and the manufacturer of the device. Nonetheless, most share some common features:

- Catheter - used to insert the probe and balloon into the anorectum. The catheter may be water-perfused, solid-state or air-charged.
- Probe - contains sensors whose number and arrangement depend on the manufacturer and type of manometry
- Sensors - records pressures and transmits them back to the controller software
- Balloon - used to assess sensation when inflated with air. Most balloons used are non-latex and are manufactured to expand to 400 ml. A separate catheter with a water-inflatable balloon may be used to conduct a balloon expulsion test.
- Software - receives data from sensors. Data is then used to calculate values to be used for analysis and to provide visual feedback.

=== Technique ===
In 2019, the International Anorectal Physiology Working Group (IAPWG) released a standardized testing protocol for the use of anorectal manometry. One of the goals of this protocol was to standardize procedural techniques to better facilitate meaningful data sharing. This protocol is the most recent published guideline for anorectal manometry since the one published in 2002 which was not widely adopted.

==== Preparation ====
Fasting is not a requirement for this procedure. Patients are informed as to how the procedure is performed, its benefits and risks. Risks include the possibility of developing discomfort, pain, minor bleeding, dizziness or a rare perforation. In the testing room, the patient is placed on their left side with their knees bent. A digital rectal exam is then performed prior to the procedure to evaluate initial anatomy and function, check for stool, and to assess patient's understanding of the verbal instructions employed during the procedure.

==== Tests ====
Anorectal manometry is often performed alongside a rectal sensory test (RST) and a balloon expulsion test (BET). The RST is performed after the manometry while the BET may be performed immediately prior to the manometry or subsequent to the RST. The total time to conduct all three tests is 15 to 20 minutes.

===== Manometry =====
This test takes approximately 10 minutes. With the use of a lubricant, an anorectal manometry catheter is introduced into the anus. The catheter is advanced until the base of the balloon is above the anal canal by 3–5 cm (1.2–2.0 in) and the most distal sensor is below the anal verge. In order, the following maneuvers are then performed:

Descriptions and purpose of maneuvers performed during manometry test
Maneuver	Description	Purpose	Length of Time
Stabilization	No instruction	Allow return to baseline	3 minutes
Rest	Patient asked to rest	Measure resting pressure, detect presence of ultraslow waves	60 seconds
Short squeeze	Squeeze as if preventing expulsion of feces or flatus	Measure squeeze pressure	3 five second squeezes each separated by 30 seconds of recovery
Long squeeze	Squeeze as if preventing expulsion of feces or flatus	Measure squeeze pressure	30 seconds followed by a 60-second interval of recovery
Cough	Cough once	Measure changes in pressure during cough	1 cough followed by a 30-second interval of recovery followed by another 1 cough
Push	Push as if defecating	Measure changes in pressure during defecation, detect presence of RAIR	3 fifteen second pushes separated by 30 seconds of recovery

===== RST =====
During the rectal sensory test, air is placed into the catheter balloon and slowly inflated either continuously or step-wise. The patient is asked to verbalize when they first sense the balloon, when the urge to defecate is first present and when they can no longer tolerate the balloon.

===== BET =====
To perform the balloon expulsion test, a catheter with a balloon on its tip is introduced into the patient's anorectum. The balloon is then distended to 50ml with water. Patients are then instructed to transfer from lying on their side to sitting on a toilet. Next, patients are asked to push out the balloon as if they are defecating. The time it takes for the expulsion of the balloon is then recorded.

=== Analysis ===
==== Resting pressure ====
The anal resting pressure is the recorded pressure within the anus during muscle relaxation. After insertion of the catheter, a short amount of time is allowed for the muscles to relax. Afterwards, pressures are recorded over 60 seconds. The maximum resting pressure is the highest pressure reached during this time period, while the mean resting pressure is the average pressure during this time period. In healthy individuals, women, especially older women, have an average lower anal resting pressures than men.

==== Squeeze pressure ====
The anal squeeze pressure is the recorded pressure within the anus during a voluntary contraction of the external anal sphincter. Similar to resting pressures, squeeze pressures in healthy women are lower than healthy men. If using high-definition anorectal manometry, asymmetry in squeeze pressures can also be measured.

==== Change of pressure during defecation ====
During defecation, the pressure in the anorectum should increase while the external anal sphincter should relax. If the pressure difference during defecation does not increase sufficiently, it may indicate poor propulsive force. Additionally, inadequate relaxation of the sphincter during defecation is another abnormal finding. Another method to assess changes during defecation is to calculate an anorectal gradient (or defecation index) in one of two ways. The anorectal gradient is either calculated as a difference (rectal pressure - anal pressure) or as a ratio (rectal pressure / anal pressure). A positive difference or a ratio over 1 indicates normal findings. Abnormal findings on manometry does not definitively indicate illness as a significant number of healthy individuals have been found to have abnormal results. Values recorded during a defecation trial are influenced by a number of factors including the degree of patient involvement in defecation efforts.

==== Rectoanal inhibitory reflex (RAIR) ====
In healthy individuals, in the process of defecating, the internal anal sphincter will reflexively relax. The lack of a rectoanal inhibitory reflex may indicate either the absence or the non-functionality of certain muscle or nerve structures involved in proper defecation.

==== Sensation ====
Patients are assessed on their anorectal sensory perception via the inflation of a balloon. As the balloon is inflated, its volume is recorded at certain milestones: initial sensation of the equipment, start of the sensory urge to defecate and the point of maximum discomfort. An increased level of sensation has been noted in disorders such as fecal incontinence, while a decreased level of sensation has been seen in individuals with dyssynergic defecation.

=== Interpretation ===
As part of the 2020 IAPWG consensus manuscript, the group published the newly created London Classification for Disorders of Anorectal Function which aimed to standardize the interpretation of anorectal manometry findings. The London Classification divided disorders into 4 parts:

London Classification for Disorders of Anorectal Function
Part	Disorder
1	Disorder of the RAIR
2	Disorders of anal tone and contractility
3	Disorders of rectoanal coordination
4	Disorders of rectal sensation

Under each part, there are a list of diagnosis that are made based on manometry findings. For example, under part 2 (Disorders of anal tone and contractility), listed manometric diagnoses include: anal hypotension, anal hypertension, anal hypercontractility and combined anal hypertension and hypercontractility. Findings are also divided into: major findings, minor findings and inconclusive findings. Major findings are findings that are not present in healthy patient such as rectoanal areflexia, Minor findings are findings that are more commonly found in patients with anorectal disease compared to healthy patients, while inconclusive findings are findings that may be present in both groups.

== Limitations ==
Centers rely on published data sets from healthy volunteers to evaluate test findings. However, the lack of standardization in equipment usage and procedural protocol can in certain cases impact the ability to determine what may be considered normal or abnormal values. This is further complicated by the limited amount of data on the impact of different epidemiological characteristics (such as age or gender) on said values. For an individual patient, findings on anorectal manometry, alone, does not dictate management. In addition to correlating manometry findings with clinical findings, as part of a diagnostic or evaluatory workup, the use of anorectal manometry may be complemented with other diagnostic tests such as endoanal ultrasound, defecography or gut transit studies. High resolution anorectal manometry also experiences pressure drift, variable linear changes in pressure readings over time, that could impact the clinical value of manometry findings in some specific situations.

== See also ==
- Esophageal motility study
- High resolution manometry
