= Gastric volvulus =

- Other names: Volvulus of stomach
- Specialty: General surgery

Gastric volvulus or volvulus of stomach is a twisting of all or part of the stomach by more than 180 degrees with obstruction of the flow of material through the stomach, variable loss of blood supply, and possible tissue death. The twisting can occur around the long axis of the stomach, called organoaxial, or around the axis perpendicular to this, called mesenteroaxial. Obstruction is more likely with organoaxial twisting than with mesenteroaxial, while the latter is more associated with ischemia. About one third of the cases are associated with a hiatal hernia. Treatment is surgical.

The classic triad (Borchardt's Triad) of gastric volvulus, described by Borchardt in 1904, consists of severe epigastric pain, retching (due to sour taste in mouth) without vomiting, and inability to pass a nasogastric tube. It reportedly occurs in 70% of cases. Sometimes, severe pain at the top of the left shoulder occurs. This may be due to internal bleeding irritating the diaphragm upon respiration.

== Classification ==
=== Organoaxial type ===
In an organoaxial gastric volvulus, the stomach rotates around an axis that connects the gastroesophageal junction and the pylorus. The antrum rotates in the opposite direction to the fundus of the stomach. This is the most common type of gastric volvulus, occurring in approximately 59% of cases, and it is usually associated with diaphragmatic defects. Strangulation and necrosis commonly occur with organoaxial gastric volvulus and have been reported in 5–28% of cases. The key imaging feature of organoaxial volvulus is that the greater curvature is located above the lesser curvature of the stomach.

=== Mesenteroaxial type ===
The mesenteroaxial axis bisects the lesser and greater curvatures. The antrum rotates anteriorly and superiorly so that the posterior surface of the stomach lies anteriorly. The rotation is usually incomplete and occurs intermittently. Vascular compromise is uncommon. This cause comprises approximately 29% of cases of gastric volvulus. The key imaging feature of mesenteroaxial volvulus is that the antrum is above the gastroesophageal junction.

=== Combined type ===
The combined type of gastric volvulus is a rare form in which the stomach twists mesentericoaxially and organoaxially. This type of gastric volvulus makes up the remainder of cases and is usually observed in patients with chronic volvulus.

== Causes ==
=== Type 1 ===
Gastric volvulus of unknown cause comprises two-thirds of cases and is presumably due to abnormal laxity of the gastrosplenic, gastroduodenal, gastrophrenic, and gastrohepatic ligaments. Type 1 gastric volvulus is more common in adults but has been reported in children.

=== Type 2 ===
Type 2 gastric volvulus is found in one third of patients and is usually associated with congenital or acquired abnormalities that result in abnormal mobility of the stomach.

== Diagnosis ==
On chest radiography, a retrocardiac, gas-filled viscus may be seen in cases of intrathoracic stomach, which confirms the diagnosis. Plain abdominal radiography reveals a massively distended viscus in the upper abdomen. In organoaxial volvulus, plain films may show a horizontally oriented stomach with a single air-fluid level and a paucity of distal gas. In mesenteroaxial volvulus, plain abdominal radiographic findings include a spherical stomach on supine images and 2 air-fluid levels on erect images, with the antrum positioned superior to the fundus.

=== Upper GI studies ===
The diagnosis of gastric volvulus is usually based on barium studies; however, some authors recommend computed tomography (CT) scanning as the imaging modality of choice.

Upper gastrointestinal (GI) contrast radiographic studies (using barium or Gastrografin) are sensitive and specific if performed with the stomach in the "twisted" state and may show an upside-down stomach. Contrast studies have been reported to have a diagnostic yield in 81–84% of patients.

Often performed for an evaluation of acute abdominal pain, a computed tomography (CT) scan can offer immediate diagnosis by showing two bubbles with a transition line. Proponents of CT scanning in the diagnosis of gastric volvulus report several benefits, including:

1. the ability to rapidly diagnose the condition based on a few coronal reconstructed images,
2. the ability to detect the presence or absence of gastric pneumatosis and free air,
3. the detection of predisposing factors (i.e., diaphragmatic or hiatal hernias), and
4. the exclusion of other abdominal pathology.

=== Endoscopy ===
Upper gastrointestinal (GI) endoscopy may be helpful in the diagnosis of gastric volvulus. When this procedure reveals distortion of the gastric anatomy with difficulty intubating the stomach or pylorus, it can be highly suggestive of gastric volvulus. In the late stage of gastric volvulus, strangulation of the blood supply can result in progressive ischemic ulceration or mucosal fissuring.

The nonoperative mortality rate for gastric volvulus is reportedly as high as 80%. Historically, mortality rates of 30–50% have been reported for acute gastric volvulus, with the major cause of death being gastric strangulation, which can lead to necrosis and perforation. With advances in diagnosis and management, the mortality rate from acute gastric volvulus is 15–20%, and that for chronic gastric volvulus is 0–13%.

== See also ==
- Gastric dilatation volvulus
