= Digestive Diseases and Sciences =

- Discipline: Gastroenterology
- Language: English
- Edited by: Jonathan Kaunitz

Publication details
- Former name(s): American Journal of Digestive Diseases
- History: 1979-present
- Publisher: Springer Science+Business Media (United States)
- Frequency: Monthly
- Impact factor: 3.487 (2021)

Standard abbreviations
- ISO 4: Dig. Dis. Sci.

Indexing
- CODEN: DDSCDJ
- ISSN: 0163-2116 (print); 1573-2568 (web)
- LCCN: 79642549
- OCLC no.: 875830194

Links
- Journal homepage; Online access

Digestive Diseases and Sciences, formerly known as the American Journal of Digestive Diseases, is a monthly peer-reviewed journal focusing on gastroenterology and hepatology. It is published by Springer Science+Business Media and the editor-in-chief is Jonathan Kaunitz (David Geffen School of Medicine). According to the Journal Citation Reports, the journal has a 2021 impact factor of 3.487 (2021) and a 5-year impact factor of 3.522.
