= Acute esophageal necrosis =

- Other names: Gurvits syndrome, black esophagus, acute necrotizing esophagitis, esophageal infarction
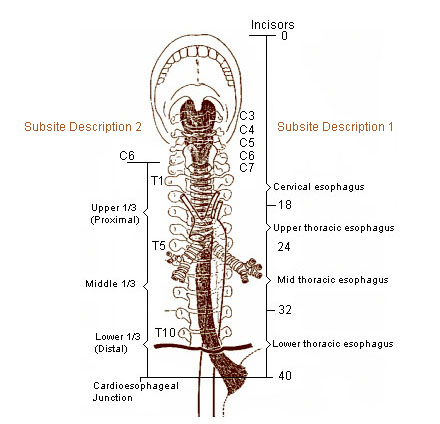
- Areas represented in image (distals) are most common locations for acute esophageal necrosis to occur. AEN defines itself predominantly in the first of three distals of the esophagus.
- Specialty: Gastroenterology
- Risk factors: Cancer, hypertension, chronic lung disease, kidney failure, malnutrition, alcohol use disorder, recreational drug use
- Diagnostic method: Upper endoscopy (EGD)
- Treatment: Varies
- Deaths: Mortality rate 30–50%

Acute esophageal necrosis (AEN), black esophagus, or Gurvits syndrome is a rare esophageal disorder. AEN defines itself with dark pigmentation of the esophagus, found during an upper gastrointestinal endoscopy. Pigmentation is usually black friable mucosa. The disorder is extremely rare, as only 89 patients over a span of 40 years have received this diagnosis. Specific study of the disorder's mortality rate is mentioned at 31.8%, but new research suggests mortality rates vary from 30 to 50%. The exact triggering mechanism for this disorder is still unknown, but is likely multifactorial.

== Signs and symptoms ==
AEN has never been recorded as a one symptom disorder, but instead present by multiple symptoms. The symptoms vary from the severity of the disorder. The most classic sign of AEN is the dark pigmentation of esophageal mucosa in an upper endoscopy, usually viewed as an ulcer or as an infectious disease. Necrosis can be found mostly between the three distals of the esophagus, but stops abruptly at the gastroesophageal junction. The basic and most common symptoms reported are blood in stool and blood in vomiting. Upper gastrointestinal bleeding then is reported, and is very commonly represented in elderly patients. Black or bloody stools and hematemesis account for over three quarters of the case presentations. Abdominal pain, nausea, vomiting, and unstable vital signs are common. A cardiovascular event (such as a heart attack) was reported in ten percent of the total known cases.

== Risk factors ==
=== Modifiable ===
Having cancer (current or previous) is currently one of the most prevalent out of all conditions among patients. High blood pressure, Chronic lung conditions, Alcohol use disorder, excessive alcohol use combined with other recreational drug use (e.g. cocaine), Kidney failure, and malnutrition are other major risk factors.

=== Nonmodifiable ===
- Advanced age (average patient aged 57 years old)
- Male sex (4 to 1 male dominance)
- Cirrhosis
- HIV/AIDS
- Herpes virus
- Atrial fibrilation
- Diabetes (currently the most prevalent out of all conditions in patients)

=== Lesser or unknown of effect ===
- Aortic dissection
- Anti-cardiolipin antibodies
- CMV infection
- Herpetic infection
- Hyperglycemia
- Hypersensitivity to broad-spectrum antibiotics
- Hypothermia
- Ischemia
- Gastric volvulus
- Posterior mediastinal haematoma
- Septic shock
- Steven Johnson syndrome

== Diagnosis ==
Acute esophageal necrosis can only be diagnosed by an upper gastrointestinal endoscopy. It is usually preceded by haemodynamic stress, which can have a variety of etiologies.

== Treatment ==
Currently, there is no direct treatment for AEN. Only treatment is for the underlying main diseases or conditions. Appropriate hydration is set. Antacids are also added for further recovery support. Common support drugs of antacids are either H_{2} receptor antagonists, and/or a proton pump inhibitor. Sucralfate was used as an option. Parenteral nutrition greatly increased chance of recovery. An esophagectomy can be issued if the disorder is severe enough.

== Prognosis ==
The prognosis for acute esophageal necrosis is generally poor, as the condition is associated with a high risk of mortality (up to 32%). Most mortality is attributed to the underlying cause; mortality specifically caused by AEN is about 6 percent.

== Society and culture ==
Acute esophageal necrosis made an appearance on an American medical drama show, Dr. G: Medical Examiner. Jan Garavaglia, the show's host, receives a female body, that at time of the autopsy had a severe case of acute esophageal necrosis due to alcohol use disorder.

== History ==
Acute esophageal necrosis was first described in autopsy cases in the mid of 20th century but only in 2007, Gurvits et al.published the first-ever systemic review on acute esophageal necrosis, described pathophysiology, risk factors, complications, introduced staging system and categorized it as a distinct syndrome.. Incidence of Gurvits syndrome increased with world wide use of endoscopy in early diagnosis.
