= Esophageal spasm =

- Other names: Oesophageal spasm
- Specialty: Gastroenterology
- Differential diagnosis: Achalasia, angina, scleroderma, esophageal cancer, esophagitis, eosinophilic esophagitis

Esophageal spasm is a disorder of motility of the esophagus.

There are two types of esophageal spasm:

- Diffuse or distal esophageal spasm (DES), where there is uncoordinated esophageal contractions
- Nutcracker esophagus (NE) also known as hypertensive peristalsis, where the contractions are coordinated but with an excessive amplitude.

Both conditions are linked to gastroesophageal reflux disease (GERD). DES and nutcracker esophagus present similarly and can may require esophageal manometry for differentiation.

When the coordinated muscle contraction are irregular or uncoordinated, this condition may be called diffuse esophageal spasm. These spasms can prevent food from reaching the stomach where food gets stuck in the esophagus. At other times the coordinated muscle contraction is very powerful, which is called nutcracker esophagus. These contractions move food through the esophagus but can cause severe pain.

== Signs and symptoms ==
The symptoms may include trouble swallowing, regurgitation, chest pain, heartburn, globus pharyngeus (which is a feeling that something is stuck in the throat) or a dry cough.

=== Complications ===
Apart from malnutrition, complications are generally associated with the underlying causes. Sharing a common cause, coronary vasospasm is of particular concern, since myocardial infarction and sudden cardiac death are potential outcomes.

== Causes ==
It is not entirely clear what causes esophageal spasms. Sometimes esophageal spasms start when someone eats hot or cold foods or drinks. However, they can also occur without eating or drinking. The increased release of acetylcholine may also be a factor, but the triggering event is not known. Spasms may also be the result of a food intolerance.

Deficiency in nitric oxide causes spontaneous contractions. The cause of esophageal spasm from deficiency can be malnutrition, since nitric oxide is produced from arginine. Another cause can be increased production of nitric oxide, following depletion, as seen with long term opioid use, where dysfunctions resolve after discontinuation.

== Diagnosis ==
The diagnosis is generally confirmed by esophageal manometry. DES is present when more than a fifth of swallows results in distal esophageal contractions. NE is present if the average strength of the contractions of the distal esophagus is greater than 180 mmHg but the contraction of the esophagus is otherwise normal.

=== Differential diagnosis ===
Often, symptoms that may suggest esophageal spasm are the result of another condition such as food intolerance, gastroesophageal reflux disease (GERD), achalasia or eosinophilic esophagitis. The symptoms can commonly be mistaken as heart palpitations.

== Treatment ==
Since esophageal spasms are often associated with other disorders, management in these cases involve attempts to correct the underlying problem. Medications may include use of calcium channel blockers (CCBs) and nitrates. Tricyclic antidepressants (TCA) and sildenafil can be used as alternative treatment options. If caused by food allergy, an elimination diet may be necessary.

There have been reports of treatment of distal esophageal spasm in 8 patients using low amounts of peppermint oil (five drops of peppermint oil in 10ml of water), and a report of treatment of an elderly patient with the same diagnosis.

Nitroglycerin has also been found effective at treating acute esophageal spasms, by increasing nitric oxide (NO) levels it acts as a smooth muscle relaxant which relaxes muscle cells and lowers pressure in the lower esophageal sphincter, reducing the intense, uncoordinated contractions in the esophagus and easing chest pain. It is often used to treat esophageal spasms associated with eosinophilic esophagitis and Gastroesophageal reflux disease (GERD), although it appears to be less effective at treating spasms in those with GERD.

=== Procedures ===
If medical therapy fails either botulinum toxin injection or surgical myotomy may be tried in distal esophageal spasms.

== Epidemiology ==
Distal esophageal spasm is rare.
