= High-resolution manometry =

Medical diagnostic system

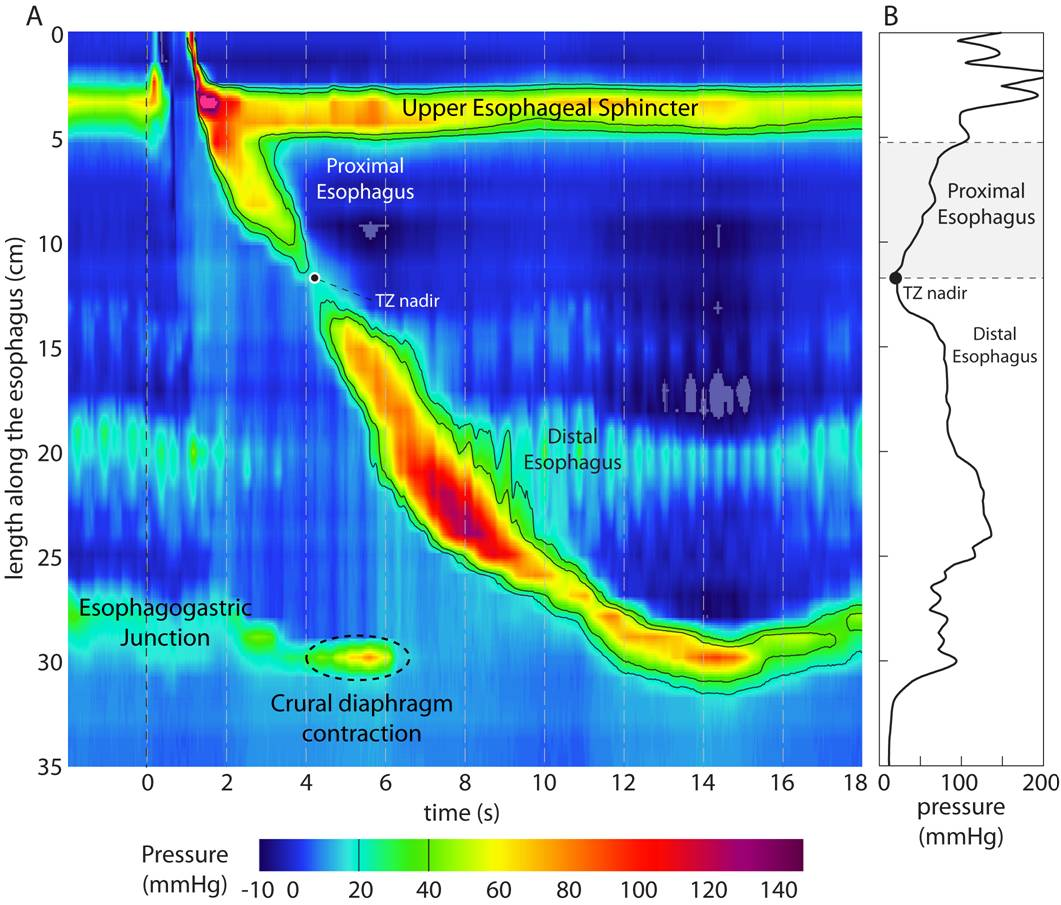
- This figure shows a pressure topography plot during a normal swallow, measured using a 36-channel high-resolution manometry system. Time is on the horizontal axis and length along the esophagus on the vertical axis. Pressure magnitude is encoded in color corresponding to the scale shown at the bottom. High-pressure regions are denoted by the red end of the spectrum. Data collected at The University Hospital, Cincinnati and plotted using MATLAB (The MathWorks Inc., Natick, MA) by Sudip K. Ghosh, PhD (University of Cincinnati)
- [edit on Wikidata]

High-resolution manometry (HRM) is a gastrointestinal motility diagnostic system that measures intraluminal pressure activity in the gastrointestinal tract using a series of closely spaced pressure sensors. For a manometry system to be classified as "high-resolution" as opposed to "conventional", the pressure sensors need to be spaced at most 1 cm apart. Two dominant pressure transduction technologies are used: solid state pressure sensors and water perfused pressure sensors. Each pressure transduction technology has its own inherent advantages and disadvantages. HRM systems also require advanced computer hardware and software to store and analyze the manometry data.

== See also ==
- Functional Lumen Imaging Probe
- Anorectal manometry
