= Jejunitis =

Disease of the small intestine

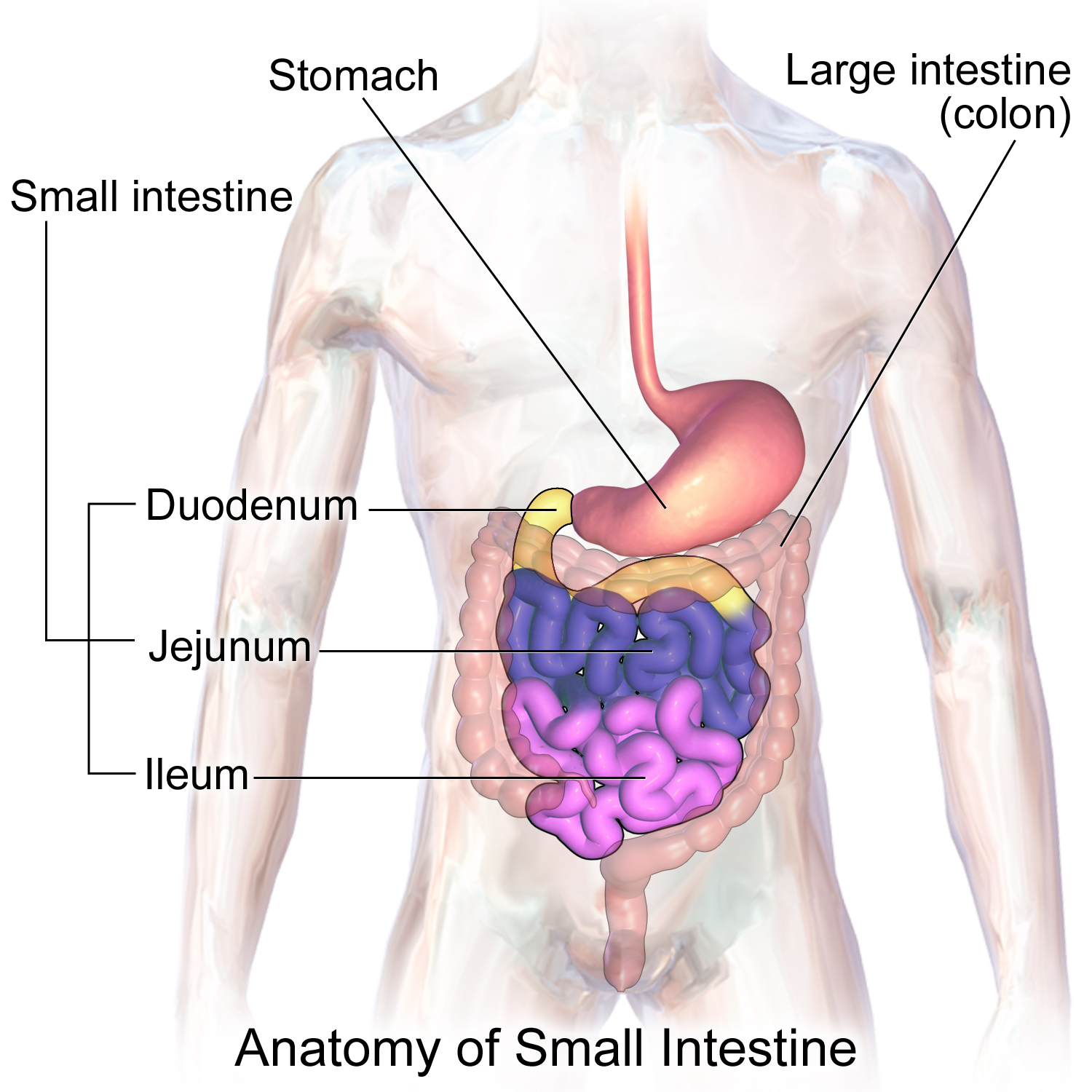
Small intestine diagram including the jejunum

Jejunitis is inflammation of the lining of the middle section of the small intestine. It is characterized by severe abdominal pain, vomiting containing bile, and foul smelling loose stools. Acute jejunitis comes on suddenly and usually only lasts a few days. Less commonly, a chronic condition may cause persistent jejunitis.

== Jejunoileitis ==
Jejunoileitis is Crohn's disease of the Jejunum. Jejunoileitis is an uncommon type of Crohn's disease with high morbidity and challenges in medical management. Common symptoms include:

- Colicky abdominal pain (91%)
- Weight loss (62%)
- Diarrhea (53%)

Most patients had severe symptoms and required at least one operation for jejunoileitis, with two-thirds of patients requiring two or more operations. The combination of anti-inflammatory drugs with the relief of recurrent obstructive symptoms by strictureplasty and resection can together produce a good long term prognosis in most patients with jejunoileitis.
