= Esophageal motility study =

Medical test

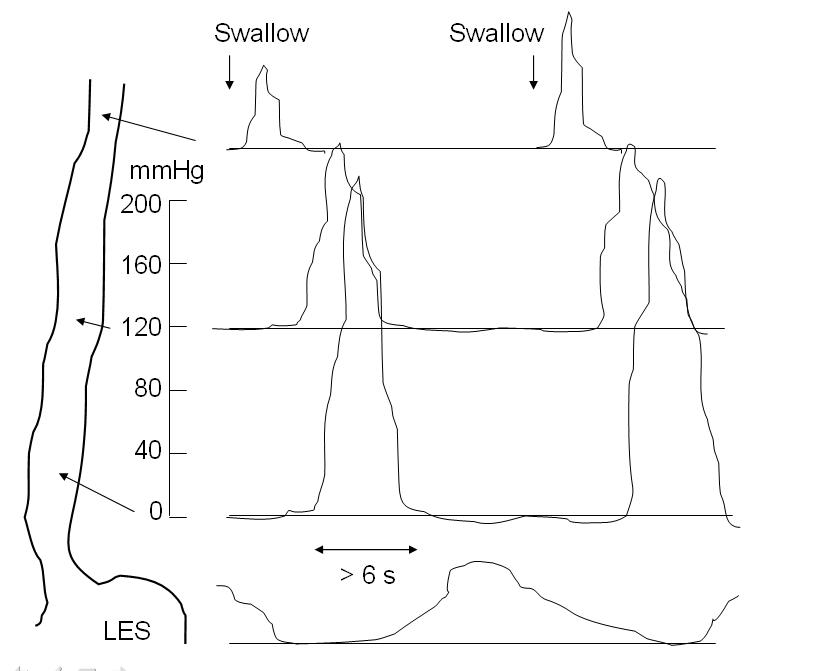
- Diagram of esophageal motility study in 'nutcracker esophagus'. The disorder shows peristalsis with high pressure esophageal contractions exceeding 180 mmHg and contractile waves with a long duration exceeding 6 seconds.
- ICD-9-CM: 89.32
- OPS-301 code: 1-313
- MedlinePlus: 003884

An esophageal motility study (EMS) or esophageal manometry is a test to assess motor function of the upper esophageal sphincter (UES), esophageal body and lower esophageal sphincter (LES).

== Indications ==
An EMS is typically done to evaluate suspected disorders of motility or peristalsis of the esophagus. These include achalasia, diffuse esophageal spasm, nutcracker esophagus and hypertensive lower esophageal sphincter. These disorders typically present with dysphagia, or difficulty swallowing, usually to both solids and liquids even initially. Other patients with spasm disorders may have the test done to diagnose chest pain thought not to be of cardiac cause.

The test is not useful for anatomical disorders of the esophagus (that is, disorders that distort the anatomy of the esophagus), such as peptic strictures and esophageal cancer.

== Procedure ==
A technician places a catheter into the nose and then guides it into the stomach. Once placed in the stomach lining, the catheter is slowly withdrawn, allowing it to detect pressure changes and to record information for later review. The patient will be asked at times to take a deep breath or to take some swallows of water. The degree of discomfort varies among patients. Patients are not sedated because sedatives would alter the functioning of the esophageal muscles. Overall the procedure takes about 45 minutes. After the procedure is complete, patients can usually resume their normal daily activities.

== Other diagnostic tests for swallowing ==
Upper gastrointestinal series and their fluoroscopic counterparts use x-rays to image the swallowing motions.

== Recent advances ==
High resolution manometry (HRM) conceived by Ray Clouse in the early 1990s and became widely adopted by the 2010s, significantly reduces the procedure time (10 minutes versus 45 minutes with conventional manometry) and provides enhanced patient comfort. Newer catheters incorporate concurrent impedance with HRM.

== See also ==
- Esophageal motility disorder
- Nutcracker esophagus
- Functional Lumen Imaging Probe
- Anorectal manometry
