= Nutcracker esophagus =

Excessively strong or long contractions of the esophagus

- Other names: Jackhammer esophagus, hypercontractile peristalsis, nutcracker achalasia
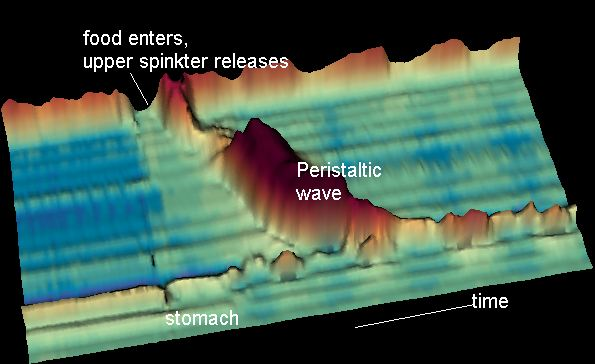
- Normal peristalsis in time space graph. Nutcracker esophagus shows higher amplitude contractions (Z-axis) that take longer to pass (X-axis)
- Specialty: Gastroenterology

Nutcracker esophagus, jackhammer esophagus, or hypercontractile peristalsis, is a disorder of the movement of the esophagus characterized by contractions in the smooth muscle of the esophagus in a normal sequence but at an excessive amplitude or duration. Nutcracker esophagus is one of several motility disorders of the esophagus, including achalasia and diffuse esophageal spasm. It causes difficulty swallowing (dysphagia) with both solid and liquid foods, and can cause significant chest pain; it may also be asymptomatic. Nutcracker esophagus can affect people of any age but is more common in the sixth and seventh decades of life.

The diagnosis is made by an esophageal motility study (esophageal manometry), which evaluates the pressure of the esophagus at various points along its length. The term "nutcracker esophagus" comes from the finding of increased pressures during peristalsis, with a diagnosis made when pressures exceed 180 mmHg; this has been likened to the pressure of a mechanical nutcracker. The disorder does not progress, and is not associated with any complications; as a result, treatment of nutcracker esophagus targets control of symptoms only.

== Signs and symptoms ==
Nutcracker esophagus is characterized as a motility disorder of the esophagus, meaning that it is caused by abnormal movement, or peristalsis of the esophagus. People with motility disorders present with two main symptoms: chest pain or difficulty with swallowing. Chest pain is the more common. The chest pain is very severe and intense, and mimics cardiac chest pain. It may spread into the arm and back. The symptoms of nutcracker esophagus are intermittent, and may occur with or without food. Rarely, patients can present with a sudden obstruction of the esophagus after eating food (termed a food bolus obstruction, or the 'steakhouse syndrome') requiring urgent treatment. The disorder does not progress to produce worsening symptoms or complications, unlike other motility disorders (such as achalasia) or anatomical abnormalities of the esophagus (such as peptic strictures or esophageal cancer). Many patients with nutcracker esophagus do not have any symptoms at all, as esophageal manometry studies done on patients without symptoms may show the same motility findings as nutcracker esophagus. Nutcracker esophagus may also be associated with metabolic syndrome. The incidence of nutcracker esophagus in all patients is uncertain.

== Pathophysiology ==
Pathology specimens of the esophagus in patients with nutcracker esophagus show no significant abnormality, unlike patients with achalasia, where destruction of the Auerbach's plexus is seen. The pathophysiology of nutcracker esophagus may be related to abnormalities in neurotransmitters or other mediators in the distal esophagus. Abnormalities in nitric oxide levels, which have been seen in achalasia, are postulated as the primary abnormality. As GERD is associated with nutcracker esophagus, the alterations in nitric oxide and other released chemicals may be in response to reflux.

== Diagnosis ==
In patients who have dysphagia, testing may first be done to exclude an anatomical cause of dysphagia, such as distortion of the anatomy of the esophagus. This usually includes visualization of the esophagus with an endoscope, and can also include barium swallow X-rays of the esophagus. Endoscopy is typically normal in patients with nutcracker esophagus; however, abnormalities associated with gastroesophageal reflux disease, or GERD, which associates with nutcracker esophagus, may be seen. Barium swallow in nutcracker esophagus is also typically normal, but may provide a definitive diagnosis if contrast is given in tablet or granule form. Studies on endoscopic ultrasound show slight trends toward thickening of the muscularis propria of the esophagus in nutcracker esophagus, but this is not useful in making the diagnosis.

=== Esophageal motility studies ===
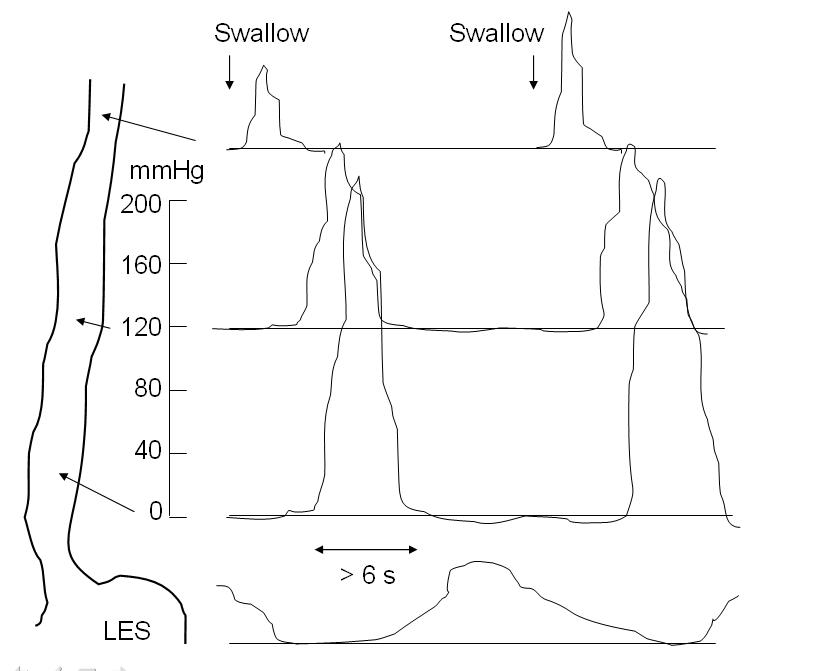
Diagram of esophageal motility study in nutcracker esophagus: The disorder shows peristalsis with high-pressure esophageal contractions exceeding 180 mmHg and contractile waves with a long duration exceeding 6 sec.

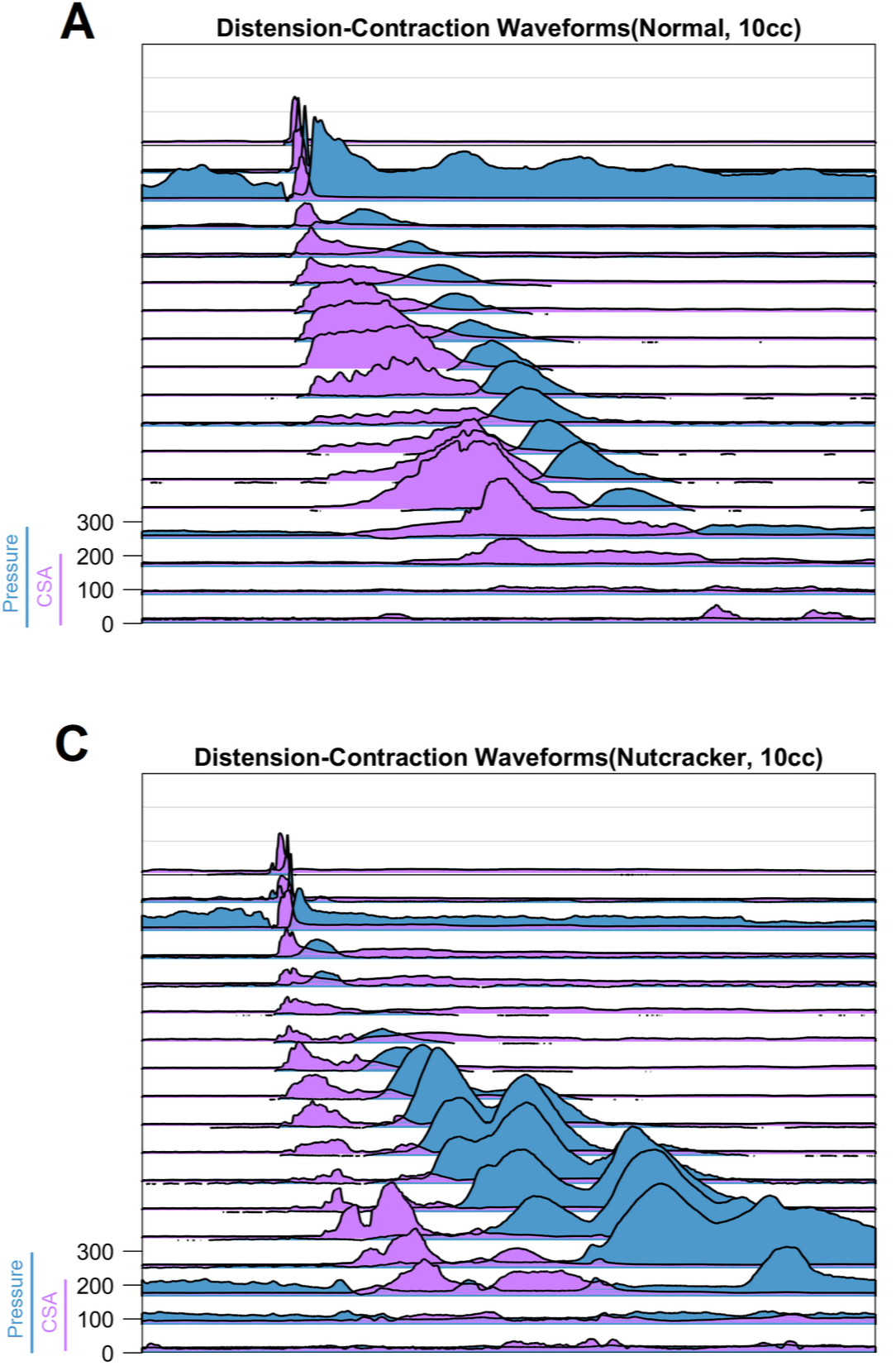
Normal esophagus in (A). Nutcracker esophagus in (C): high-pressure waves in blue; cross-sectional areas (CSA) in fucsia.

The diagnosis of nutcracker esophagus is typically made with an esophageal motility study, which shows characteristic features of the disorder. Esophageal motility studies involve pressure measurements of the esophagus after a patient takes a wet (fluid-containing) or dry (solid-containing) swallow. Measurements are usually taken at various points in the esophagus.

Nutcracker esophagus is characterized by a number of criteria described in the literature. The most commonly used criteria are the Castell criteria, named after American gastroenterologist D.O. Castell. The Castell criteria include one major criterion: a mean peristaltic amplitude in the distal esophagus of more than 180 mm Hg. The minor criterion is the presence of repetitive contractions (meaning two or more) that are greater than six seconds in duration. Castell also noted that the lower esophageal sphincter relaxes normally in nutcracker esophagus, but has an elevated pressure of greater than 40 mm Hg at baseline.

Three other criteria for the definition of the nutcracker esophagus have been defined. The Gothenburg criterion consists of the presence of peristaltic contractions, with an amplitude of 180 mm Hg at any place in the esophagus. The Richter criterion involves the presence of peristaltic contractions with an amplitude of greater than 180 mm Hg from an average of measurements taken 3 and 8 cm above the lower esophageal sphincter. It has been incorporated into a number of clinical guidelines for the evaluation of dysphagia. The Achem criteria are more stringent, and are an extension of the study of 93 patients used by Richter and Castell in the development of their criteria, and require amplitudes of greater than 199 mm Hg at 3 cm above the lower esophageal sphincter (LES), greater than 172 mm Hg at 8 cm above the LES, or greater than 102 mm Hg at 13 cm above the LES.

== Treatment ==
People are usually reassured that the disease is unlikely to worsen. However, the symptoms of chest pain and trouble swallowing may be severe enough to require treatment with medications, and rarely, surgery.

The initial step of treatment focuses on reducing risk factors. While weight reduction may be useful in reducing symptoms, the role of acid suppression therapy to reduce esophageal reflux is still uncertain. Very cold and very hot beverages may trigger esophageal spasms.

=== Medications ===
Medications for nutcracker esophagus includes the use of calcium-channel blockers, which relax the lower esophageal sphincter (LES) and palliate the dysphagia symptoms. Diltiazem, a calcium-channel blocker, has been used in randomized control studies with good effect. Nitrate medications, including isosorbide dinitrate, given before meals, may also help relax the LES and improve symptoms. The inexpensive generic combination of belladonna and phenobarbital (Donnatal and other brands) may be taken three times daily as a tablet to prevent attacks or, for patients with only occasional episodes, as an elixir at the onset of symptoms. Phosphodiesterase inhibitors, such as sildenafil, can be given to reduce symptoms, particularly pain, but small trials have not been able to demonstrate clinical improvement.

=== Procedures ===
Endoscopic therapy with botulinum toxin can also be used to improve dysphagia which stabilizes unintentional weight loss, but the effect has limited effect on other symptoms, including pain, while also being a temporary treatment lasting a few weeks. Finally, pneumatic dilatation of the esophagus, which is an endoscopic technique where a high-pressure balloon is used to stretch the muscles of the LES, can be performed to improve symptoms, but again no clinical improvement is seen in regards to motility.

In people who have no response to medical or endoscopic therapy, surgery can be performed. A Heller myotomy involves an incision to disrupt the LES and the myenteric plexus that innervates it. The Heller myotomy is used as a final treatment option in patients who do not respond to other therapies.

== Prognosis ==
Nutcracker esophagus is a benign, nonprogressive condition, meaning it is not associated with significant complications.

== See also ==
- Esophageal spasm
