= Rabeprazole =

Stomach acid suppressing medication

Clinical data
- Pronunciation: /rəˈbɛprəˌzɔːl/
- Trade names: Aciphex, Pariet, Rafron, others
- AHFS/Drugs.com: Monograph
- MedlinePlus: a699060
- License data: US DailyMed: Rabeprazole; US FDA: Rabeprazole
- Pregnancy category: AU: B1
- Routes of administration: By mouth
- Drug class: Proton pump inhibitor
- ATC code: A02BC04 (WHO) A02BC54 (WHO) A02BD12 (WHO) A02BD13 (WHO)

Legal status
- Legal status: UK: POM (Prescription only); US: ℞-only

Pharmacokinetic data
- Bioavailability: 52%
- Protein binding: 96.3%
- Metabolism: CYP2C19 and CYP3A4 in the liver
- Metabolites: thioether carboyxlic acid metabolite, thioether glucuronide metabolite, sulfone metabolite
- Elimination half-life: ~1 hour
- Excretion: 90% via kidney as metabolites

Identifiers
- IUPAC name: (RS)-2-([4-(3-Methoxypropoxy)-3-methylpyridin-2-yl]methylsulfinyl)-1H-benzo[d]imidazole
- CAS Number: 117976-89-3
- PubChem CID: 5029
- IUPHAR/BPS: 7290
- DrugBank: DB01129
- ChemSpider: 4853
- UNII: 32828355LL
- KEGG: D08463; C07864
- ChEBI: CHEBI:8768
- ChEMBL: ChEMBL1219
- PDB ligand: RZX (PDBe, RCSB PDB)
- CompTox Dashboard (EPA): DTXSID3044122
- ECHA InfoCard: 100.123.408

Chemical and physical data
- Formula: C_{18}H_{21}N_{3}O_{3}S
- Molar mass: 359.44 g·mol^{−1}
- 3D model (JSmol): Interactive image
- Chirality: Racemic mixture
- SMILES: CC1=C(C=CN=C1CS(=O)C2=NC3=CC=CC=C3N2)OCCCOC
- InChI: InChI=1S/C18H21N3O3S/c1-13-16(19-9-8-17(13)24-11-5-10-23-2)12-25(22)18-20-14-6-3-4-7-15(14)21-18/h3-4,6-9H,5,10-12H2,1-2H3,(H,20,21); Key:YREYEVIYCVEVJK-UHFFFAOYSA-N

Rabeprazole, sold under the brand name Aciphex, among others, is a medication that decreases stomach acid. It is used to treat peptic ulcer disease, gastroesophageal reflux disease, and excess stomach acid production such as in Zollinger–Ellison syndrome. It may also be used in combination with other medications to treat Helicobacter pylori. Effectiveness is similar to other proton pump inhibitors (PPIs). It is taken by mouth.

Common side effects include constipation, feeling weak, and throat inflammation. Serious side effects may include osteoporosis, low blood magnesium, Clostridioides difficile infection, and pneumonia. Use in pregnancy and breastfeeding is of unclear safety. It works by blocking H^{+}/K^{+}-ATPase in the parietal cells of the stomach.

Rabeprazole was patented in 1986, and approved for medical use in 1997. It is available as a generic medication. In 2017, it was the 288th most commonly prescribed medication in the United States, with more than 1 million prescriptions.

== Medical uses ==
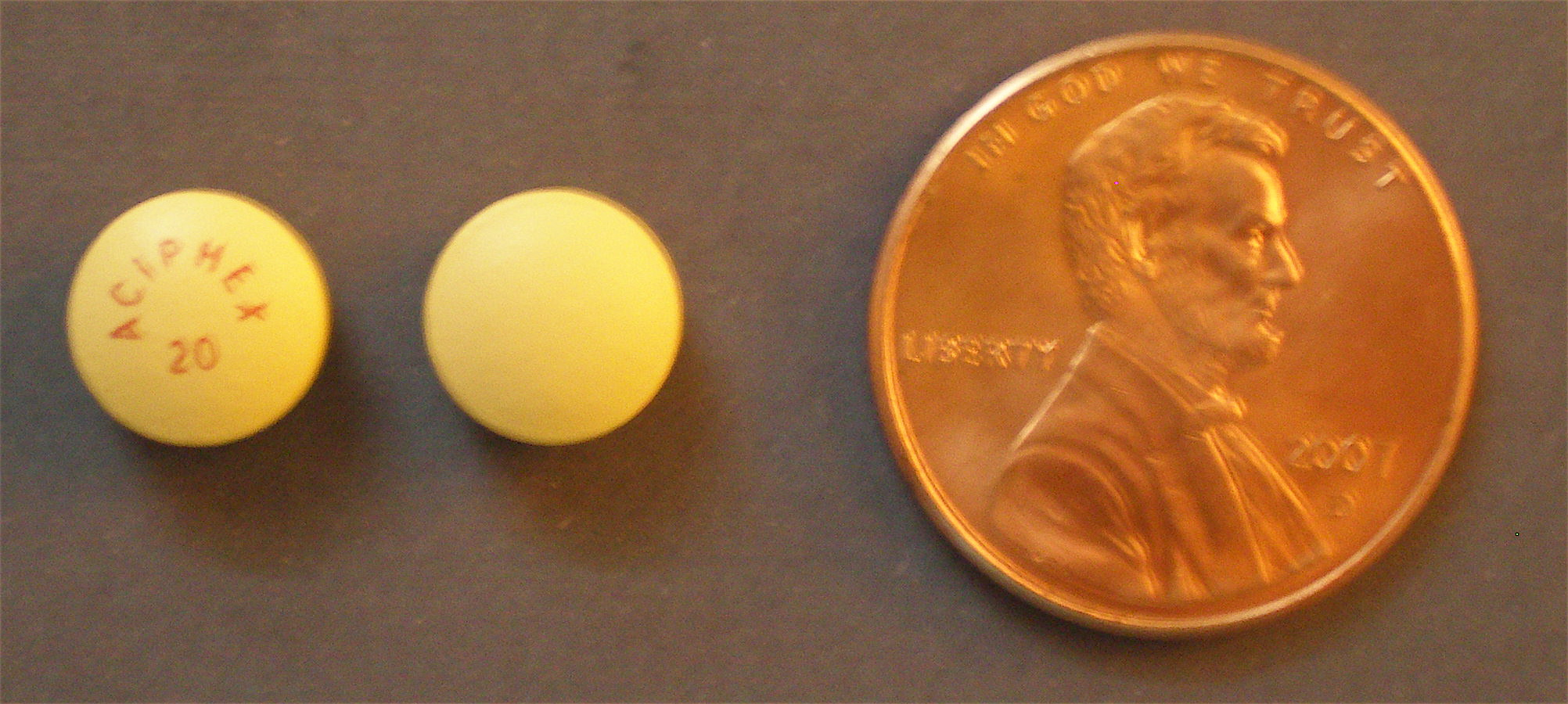
Brand-name rabeprazole tablets

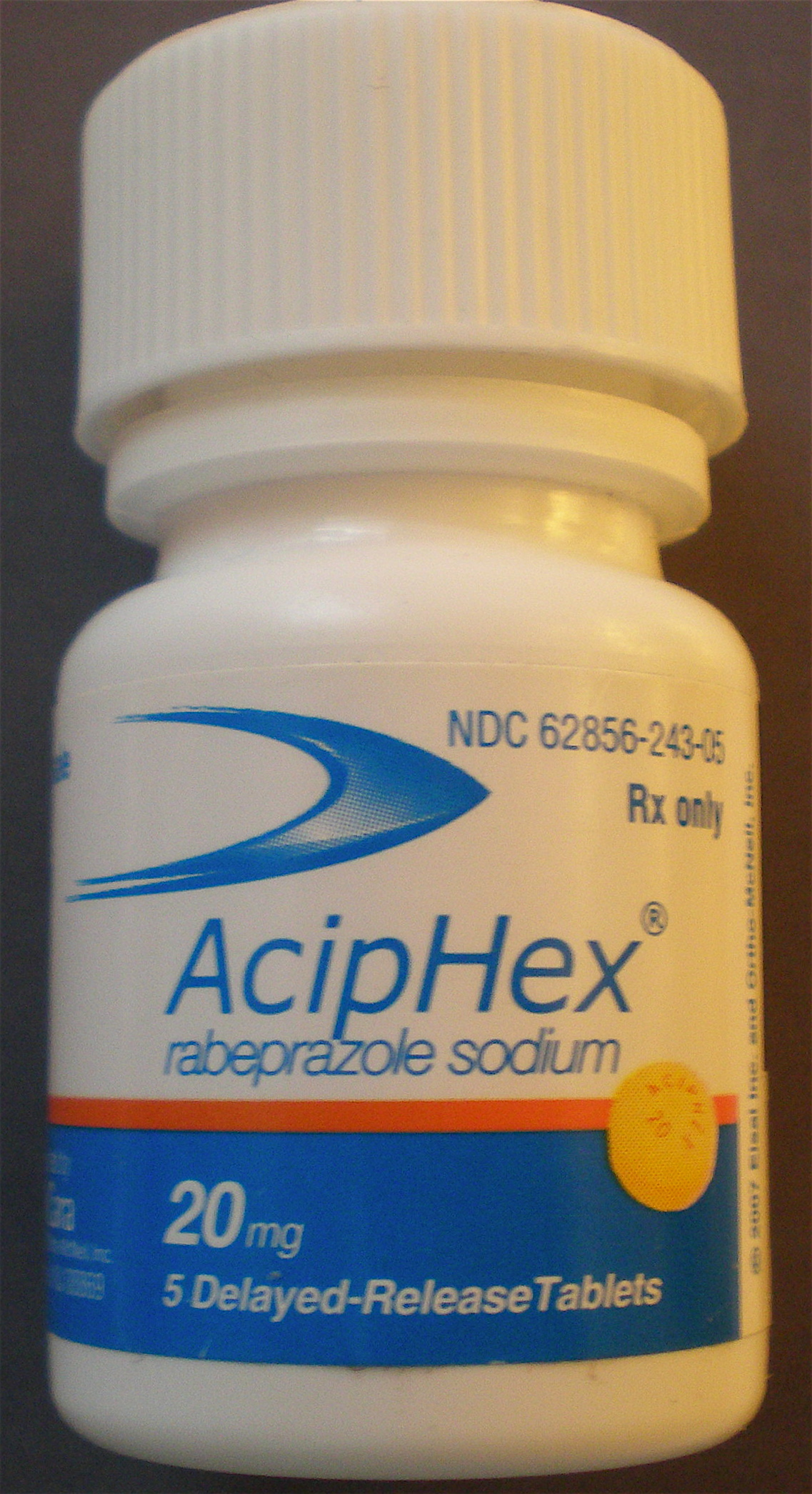
Bottle of rabeprazole 20 mg tablets

Rabeprazole, like other proton pump inhibitors such as omeprazole, is used for the purposes of gastric acid suppression. This effect is beneficial for the treatment and prevention of conditions in which gastric acid directly worsens symptoms, such as duodenal and gastric ulcers. In the setting of gastroesophageal reflux disease (GERD), whose pathophysiology is characterized by prolonged exposure to gastric acid in the esophagus (often due to changes in stomach and/or esophagus anatomy, such as those induced by abdominal obesity), acid suppression can provide symptomatic relief. Acid suppression is also useful when gastric production of acid is increased, including rare conditions with excess gastric acid secretion (hypersecretory conditions) like Zollinger–Ellison syndrome (ZES), multiple endocrine neoplasia type 1 (MEN-1), and systemic mastocytosis. In an open-label, industry-sponsored, non-controlled study of high-dose rabeprazole for the treatment of ZES and idiopathic gastric acid hypersecretion (IGAH), including patients with MEN-1 and GERD, rabeprazole induced and maintained suppression of basal acid output over a 24 month period. Only one patient withdrew from the study due to an elevation in creatine phosphokinase judged to be possibly due to rabeprazole, while rabeprazole was otherwise well-tolerated in this population. There are no clinical trials to date that have studied the precise use of rabeprazole, or any PPI, for the treatment of acid-related complaints due to systemic mastocytosis, but acid suppressing medications such as PPIs and H_{2} receptor antagonists are routinely used to counter the histamine-mediated acid secretion found in this disorder.

Rabeprazole is also useful alongside antibiotic therapy for the treatment of the pathogen Helicobacter pylori, which otherwise thrives in acidic environments. In the original studies that gave rise to its approval for the eradication of H. pylori, rabeprazole was studied in combination with amoxicillin and clarithromycin. This triple therapy was studied at the specific doses of rabeprazole 20 mg twice daily, amoxicillin 1000 mg twice daily, and clarithromycin 500 mg twice daily for 7 days, which is a higher dose of rabeprazole than what is used for the treatment of simple GERD (20 mg once daily). The higher dose is thought to provide more consistent elevation of pH in the stomach, leading to better eradication of H. pylori, congruent with the dosing strategies of other PPIs for this indication. Notably, H. pylori eradication with antibiotics and rabeprazole was also shown to prevent development of second gastric cancer in a randomized trial in high-risk South Korean patients with early stomach cancer treated by endoscopy.

Thus, rabeprazole is US Food and Drug Administration (FDA) approved for the treatment of symptomatic GERD in adolescents and adults, healing duodenal ulcers in adults, eradication of Helicobacter pylori, and pathologic hypersecretory conditions.

=== Available forms ===
Rabeprazole is available in 10 and 20 mg, delayed-release tablets (pictured below). Rabeprazole-based products, like other proton pump inhibitor products, have to be formulated in delayed-release tablets to protect the active medication from being degraded by the acid of the stomach before being absorbed.

=== Specific populations ===
==== Pediatrics ====
Rabeprazole's only pediatric indication is for the treatment of symptomatic GERD in adolescents (12 years-old and up).

==== Pregnancy ====
The FDA originally labeled rabeprazole as a pregnancy category B drug (meaning that in vivo research failed to demonstrate a fetal hazard, though human studies are lacking), but it was reclassified as a pregnancy category C drug (meaning that in vivo research has shown a fetal hazard, though the benefit of use may outweigh the risk) in 2014. This was after the publishing of an in vivo study that detected changes in bone morphology in rats treated with esomeprazole. In these rats, the following observations were noted:

- shortened femurs, decreased width and thickness of cortical bone, decreased thickness of the tibial growth plate, and minimal to mild bone marrow hypocellularity occurred at doses equal to or greater than 3.4 times the daily maximum recommended human dose (MRHD);
- decreased survival, decreased birth weight, and an increase in neurobehavioral delays occurred at doses equal to or greater than 16.8 times the daily MRHD;
- physeal dysplasia of the femur occurred at doses equal to or greater than 33.6 times the daily MRHD.

In vivo studies on rabbits with rabeprazole doses of up to 50 mg/kg/day (about 13 times the normal human drug exposure of rabeprazole at 20 mg) failed to show evidence of fetal harm.

==== Lactation ====
It is expected that rabeprazole will be secreted into human breast milk, though the clinical impact of this is still unknown. Avoiding rabeprazole during breastfeeding confers to lowest possible risk.

==== Geriatrics ====
Advanced age does not appear to clinically impact rabeprazole's metabolism. However, elevations in the maximum plasma concentration and the total drug exposure (area under the curve, AUC) have occurred.

==== Japanese ancestry ====
In a study on rabeprazole's pharmacokinetics, the AUC was elevated by approximately 50–60% in men of Japanese ancestry compared to men in the United States. See the pharmacogenetics section below for a pharmacogenetic explanation of these findings.

==== Kidney or liver problems ====
In people that have kidney or liver problems, these problems do not appear to affect rabeprazole's metabolism in a clinically meaningful way. This includes individuals on dialysis for kidney problems. Severe liver problems like cirrhosis of the liver do affect rabeprazole's elimination half-life, but not to a degree of dangerous accumulation. In a review of patients taking rabeprazole while having end-stage kidney disease and mild-to-moderate severity, chronic compensated cirrhosis of the liver, the alteration in rabeprazole's metabolism was not clinically meaningful.

== Contraindications ==
Rabeprazole is contraindicated in the following populations and situations:

- people with a known hypersensitivity to rabeprazole, substituted benzimidazoles (which are chemically similar to rabeprazole, like omeprazole), or any other component of the capsule formulation (e.g. certain dyes)
- concurrent use of rilpivirine, a medication used to treat HIV infection

=== Hypersensitivity ===
==== Syndrome ====
An allergy to a PPI like rabeprazole may take the form of type I hypersensitivity or delayed hypersensitivity reactions. A selective (pattern C—see below for a discussion of cross-reactivity patterns) type I hypersensitivity reaction to rabeprazole resulting in anaphylaxis has been reported, as well as several whole group hypersentivities.

==== Cross-reactivity ====
Hypersensitivity to PPIs can take the form of whole group hypersensitivity, pattern A, B, or C. Whole group hypersentivity occurs when a person is cross-reactive to all PPIs; that is, all PPIs will induce the allergy. In pattern A, a person may be allergic to omeprazole, esomeprazole, and pantoprazole, but not to lansoprazole and rabeprazole. This is thought to be due to the structural similarities between omeprazole, esomeprazole, and pantoprazole, contrasted with lansoprazole and rabeprazole. Pattern B is the opposite, reflecting people that are allergic to lansoprazole and rabeprazole, but not to omeprazole, esomeprazole, and pantoprazole. Pattern C, in the context of rabeprazole, would reflect a person that is allergic to only rabeprazole, but not to other PPIs (omeprazole, esomeprazole, pantoprazole, and lansoprazole).

=== Rilpivirine ===
Rilpivirine, a non-nucleoside reverse transcriptase inhibitor (NNRTI) used in the treatment of HIV, is contraindicated with all PPIs because of their acid-suppressing effect. PPIs suppress acid, thereby raising the pH of (alkalizing) the stomach's contents. Rilpivirine is best absorbed under acidic conditions. Therefore, rabeprazole would be expected to decrease the absorption of rilpivirine, decrease the concentration of rilpivirine in the blood, and possibly lead to therapeutic failure and induce resistance of the HIV virus to rilpivirine and/or cross-resistance with other NNRTIs.

== Adverse effects ==
In general, rabeprazole is fairly well tolerated, even with up to five years of continuous use (the duration of follow-up in a pharmacovigilance clinical trial). The side effect profile is similar to that of omeprazole. The side effect profile is similar to that of omeprazole and other commonly used PPIs. The most common side effects include headache, nausea, and diarrhea. Rare side effects include rashes, flu-like symptoms, and infections (including by the gastrointestinal pathogen Clostridioides difficile). Rare instances of rabeprazole-induced liver injury (also known as hepatotoxicity) have been reported. Characteristic proton-pump inhibitor hepatotoxicity occurs within the first 4 weeks of starting the medication.

Gastrin is an endogenous human hormone that stimulates gastric acid secretion and regulating the growth of certain cells in the stomach. Enterochromafin-like (ECL) cells, responsible for stimulating gastric acid secretion by the release of histamine in the stomach, respond to prolonged gastrin exposure by growing and proliferating. Rabeprazole is associated with elevated serum gastrin levels (hypergastrinemia), which occurs through inhibiting the negative feedback of stomach acid on gastrin secretion by G cells in the antrum of the stomach. The elevation in serum gastrin levels are thought to be dependent upon the degree of rabeprazole's CYP2C19 metabolism. Rabeprazole is not as significantly metabolized by CYP2C19 compared to other medications in the same class, like omeprazole. Hypergastrinemia has been posited as a potential source of rabeprazole-induced neuropsychiatric symptoms (e.g. dizziness, numbness, and tremor), though more research is needed to clarify the effect and mechanism.

Prolonged elevated serum gastrin has been shown to cause rat ECL cells to form carcinoid tumors. According to a 2013 meta-analysis of observational studies, the use of acid-suppressing drugs (including PPIs like rabeprazole, but also histamine receptor 2 antagonists) may be associated with the development of gastric cancer. The studies included in the meta-analysis did not differentiate between rabeprazole and other PPIs, so it is unclear if the potential risk may differ across the PPI class.

Acid suppression via rabeprazole can decrease the absorption of vitamin B12 and magnesium, leading to deficiency. A case of rabeprazole-induced iron deficiency anemia has been reported. Theoretically, rabeprazole could induce an iron deficiency anemia by reducing the dietary absorption of iron, which requires acid for bioavailability.

Very serious side effects have been reported in people taking rabeprazole, but there is no direct evidence that rabeprazole definitely caused these side effects. These include Stevens-Johnson syndrome (a serious disease characterized by skin rash and risk of organ failure), serious blood cell abnormalities, coma, and death. Other possible side effects, common to other PPI medications in the same class, include bone fractures due to osteoporosis, serious infections (including Clostridioides difficile), and kidney damage (nephrotoxicity). A rare, though less understood, side effect of the PPI class is the risk of myopathy and rhabdomyolysis, a syndrome of striated muscle destruction.

=== Osteoporosis and fractures ===
The mechanism of PPI-induced osteoporosis and fractures is unclear, but hypotheses include hypocalcemia and hypomagnesemia, hyperparathyroidism, and B12 deficiency (inducing neurological deficits and subsequent falls). In opposition to the calcium malabsorption hypothesis, rabeprazole prevented reductions in bone mineral density akin to the effect of minodronic acid in a study of gastrectomized rats. Midodronic acid is a bisphosphonate class drug used to prevent fractures in osteoporosis. Unlike midodronic acid, rabeprazole did not affect serum calcium levels, although the attenuation of gastrectomy-induced bone mineral density reduction at the distal end of the femur suggested inhibition of bone resorption by osteoclasts (like a bisphosphonate).

=== Infection risk ===
PPIs have been associated with an increased risk for pneumonia by meta-analyses of case-control and cohort studies. One hypothesis for this association is that PPI-induced acid suppression fosters the growth of aerobic bacteria in the stomach, which can be transferred to the lungs by microaspiration, promoting colonization and subsequent pneumonia. Other hypotheses include off-target proton pump inhibition in the lungs, altering the pH of pulmonary mucus in favor of bacterial growth, and direct inhibition of the activity of white blood cells such as neutrophils and natural killer cells. In line with the stomach acid suppression hypothesis for bacterial overgrowth, PPIs have also been associated with Clostridioides difficile infections. However, as these meta-analyses have pooled PPIs together, it is unknown whether the risk of infection differs significantly between rabeprazole and other members of the PPI class. Rabeprazole was identified as the causative agent in a case report of collagenous colitis, inducing chronic, watery diarrhea.

Other enteric, infectious organisms associated with PPI use include Campylobacter and Salmonella. Both pathogens are sensitive to acid; theoretically, as above, acid suppression by PPIs should increase their pathogenicity. It is unclear if the observed association is due to the PPI itself, as one cohort study found that the association could be explained by the demographic factors of patients prescribed PPIs (e.g. concurrent use of immunosuppressant medications, older age, and antibiotic use). In a clinical trial of 255 Japanese patients, the incidence of PPI-associated diarrhea did not differ between rabeprazole, omeprazole, or lansoprazole.

=== Nephrotoxicity ===
Forms of kidney damage associated with PPIs in one meta-analysis include acute interstitial nephritis (AIN) (insufficient quality evidence), acute kidney injury (AKI) (low grade evidence), chronic kidney disease (CKD) (low grade evidence), and end-stage renal disease (insufficient quality evidence). The first reported case of rabeprazole-induced acute interstital nephritis occurred in a 62 year-old female in Australia, prescribed rabeprazole for complaints of dyspepsia due to suspected GERD. The mechanism for PPI-induced acute interstital nephritis has not been elucidated, though an immune-related hypothesis has been posited on the basis of extra-renal toxicity consistent with an immunologic, hypersensitivity reaction. It has also been posited that incomplete resolution of PPI-induced acute interstitial nephritis could precede acute kidney injury and chronic kidney disease.

=== Muscle-related adverse events ===
Cases of progressive muscle weakness, muscle pain, and rhabdomyolysis following administration of PPIs have been reported in the scientific literature. However, the mechanism for these muscle-related adverse events has yet to be established. In one case, rhabdomyolysis developed in a 50 year-old patient 2 weeks after starting both rabeprazole and domperidone, a prokinetic and antiemetic agent, which resolved after discontinuation of both drugs. Per the French imputability method of causality assessment, it was determined that rabeprazole was a "plausible" cause of the rhabdomyolysis, noting that domperidone was started concurrently.

== Overdose ==
No signs and symptoms have been reported in overdoses of rabeprazole up to 80 mg, but case examples are limited. Notably, rabeprazole has been used in higher doses for the treatment of hypersecretory conditions like Zollinger-Ellison syndrome (up to 120 mg daily).

Animal experiments with ultra-high doses of rabeprazole have demonstrated lethality through unknown mechanisms. The lethal overdose syndrome in animals is characterized by convulsion and coma.

== Interactions ==
=== Drug-drug interactions ===
Rabeprazole does not interfere with the plasma concentration of drugs that are also metabolized by the same enzymes (i.e. CYP2C19) that it is metabolized by. Therefore, it is not expected to react with CYP2C19 substrates like theophylline, warfarin, diazepam, and phenytoin. However, the acid-suppression effects of rabeprazole, like other PPIs, may interfere with the absorption of drugs that require acid, such as ketoconazole and digoxin.

There is some evidence that omeprazole and esomeprazole, two medications in the same class as rabeprazole, can disturb the conversion of an anticoagulant medication called clopidogrel to its active metabolite. However, because this is thought to be mediated by the effect of omeprazole and esomeprazole on CYP2C19, the enzyme that activates clopidogrel, this drug interaction is not expected to occur as strongly with rabeprazole. However, whether the effect of omeprazole and esomeprazole on clopidogrel's metabolism actually leads to poor clinical outcomes is still a matter of intense debate among healthcare professionals.

Clinically serious drug-drug interactions may involve the acid-suppression effects of rabeprazole. For example, rabeprazole should not be used concomitantly with rilpivirine, an anti-HIV therapy, which requires acid for absorption. Lowered plasma concentrations of rilpivirine could lead to progression of HIV infection. Other drugs that require acid for absorption include antifungal drugs like ketoconazole and itraconazole, digoxin, iron, mycophenolate, and tyrosine kinase inhibitors like erlotinib, dasatinib, and nilotinib. There is no clinically relevant drug interaction between rabeprazole and antacids.

=== Food-drug interactions ===
Food does not affect the amount of rabeprazole that enters the body, but it does delay its onset of effect by about 1.7 hours.

== Pharmacology ==
=== Mechanism of action ===
Once rabeprazole is taken by mouth, the enteric coating of the tablet allows the drug to pass through the stomach intact. Like other PPIs, rabeprazole is absorbed into the blood stream at the site of the proximal small bowel. Rabeprazole's mechanism of action involves crossing from the blood stream into the parietal cells of the stomach, which are the cells that are responsible for secreting hydrochloric acid (HCl). At this point, rabeprazole is inactive. However, rabeprazole is then secreted into the secretory canaliculus of the parietal cells, which is the space from which acid secretion occurs. Here, acid secretion is mediated by the energy-dependent acid pumps, called hydrogen potassium adenosine triphosphatase (H^{+}/K^{+} ATPase) pumps. These enzymatic pumps have cysteine amino acid residues. After being activated by gastric (stomach) acid to a reactive sulfenamide intermediate, rabeprazole permanently binds the cysteine residues, forming covalent, disulfide bonds. This action fundamentally alters the configuration of the acid pump, thereby inhibiting its activity. Thus, acid can no longer be secreted into the gastric lumen (the empty space of the stomach), and the pH of the stomach increases (decrease in the concentration of hydrogen ions, H^{+}). Due to the permanent inhibition of the individual proton pump that each molecule of rabeprazole has bound to, acid secretion is effectively suppressed until new proton pumps are produced by the parietal cells.

Rabeprazole, like other medications in the same class, cannot inhibit the H^{+}/K^{+} ATPase pumps found in lysosomes, a cellular organelle that degrades biological molecules, because the pumps found in these organelles lack the cysteine residues involved in rabeprazole's mechanism of action.

A unique feature of rabeprazole's mechanism of action in inhibiting acid secretion involves its activation. The pKa (the pH at which 50% of the drug becomes positively charged) of rabeprazole is around 5.0, meaning that it doesn't take a lot of acid to activate it. While this theoretically translates into a faster onset of action for rabeprazole's acid-inhibiting effect, the clinical implications of this fact have yet to be elucidated. Theoretically, a high pKa should correlate with off-target activation of the PPI (possibly inducing side effects), though the clinical relevance of this has also yet to be elucidated. See Table 1 for a pKa comparison across PPIs.

Proton pump inhibitor pKa
PPI	Omeprazole	Esomeprazole	Lansoprazole	Dexlansoprazole	Pantoprazole	Rabeprazole
pKa	4.13	4.13	4.01	9.35	3.96	4.90

Table 1 | Comparative pKa values across PPIs. Note that the pKa of dexlansoprazole is a calculated value from a different source, which may have used differing methods than the other PPIs studied.

=== Pharmacokinetics ===
Rabeprazole's bioavailability is approximately 52%, meaning that 52% of orally administered dose is expected to enter systemic circulation (the bloodstream). Once in the blood, rabeprazole is approximately 96.3%–97% bound to plasma proteins. The biological half-life of rabeprazole in humans is approximately one hour. It takes about 3.5 hours for rabeprazole to reach the maximum concentration in human plasma after a single orally administered dose. Oral absorption is independent of the dose administered.

Rabeprazole is extensively metabolized by the liver. 90% of the drug is rendered into metabolites by the liver, which are then excreted by the kidneys. 10% of the dose is excreted in the feces. The drug metabolizing enzymes primarily responsible for rabeprazole's metabolism are CYP2C19 and CYP3A4. However, rabeprazole is mainly metabolized through non-enzymatic reduction to a thioether metabolite. Some of rabeprazole's metabolites include the following: a thioether carboxylic acid metabolite, a thioether glucuronide metabolite, and a sulfone metabolite. The most common metabolites excreted in the urine are the mercapturic acid conjugate and carboxylic acid. A diagram of rabeprazole's phase I metabolism is shown below.

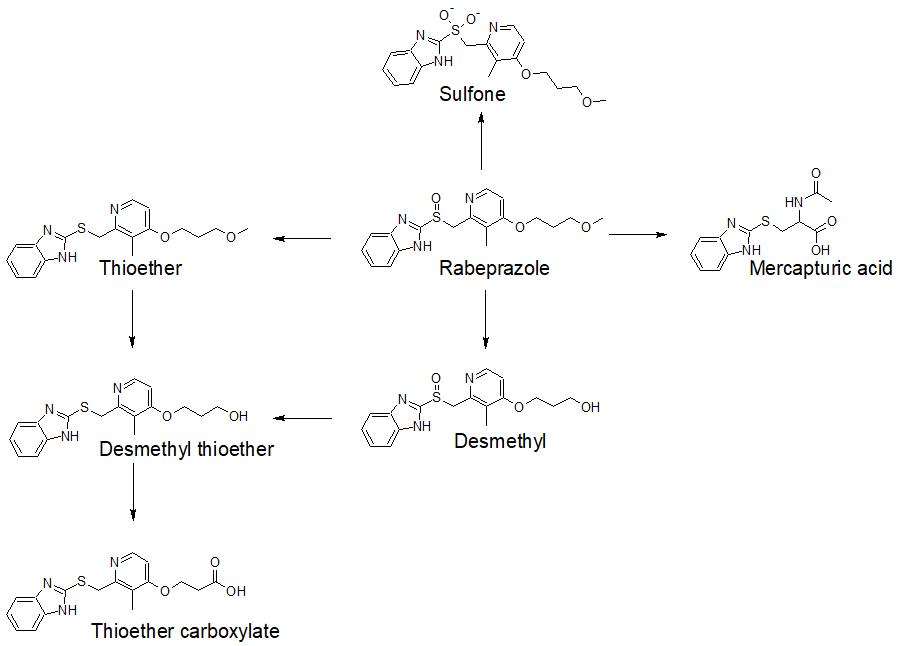
Phase I metabolism of rabeprazole, drawn in ChemSketch

=== Pharmacogenetics ===
The effect of rabeprazole may vary based upon the genetics of the individual taking the medication. People may have differences in their capacity to metabolize rabeprazole to an inactive metabolite. This may be mediated through genetic differences in the gene that encodes for the metabolic enzyme CYP2C19. For example, people that are poor CYP2C19 metabolizers (i.e. their version of CYP2C19 is less effective than average) will have trouble metabolizing rabeprazole, allowing the active rabeprazole to stay in the body, where it can exert its effect, longer than intended. Conversely, extensive CYP2C19 metabolizers (i.e. the average metabolic capacity of CYP2C19) will extensively metabolize rabeprazole, as expected. The poor metabolizing CYP2C19 phenotype is found in roughly 3–5% of Caucasian people, and in 17–20% of people of Asian ancestry. In a study on men of Japanese ancestry, this has translated to an average increase of total drug exposure by 50–60% compared to men in the United States.

However, rabeprazole's metabolism is primarily non-enzymatic (it is often inactivated chemically, without the participation of the body's natural drug metabolizing enzymes). Therefore, while a person's CYP2C19 phenotype will affect rabeprazole's metabolism, it is not expected to dramatically affect the efficacy of the medication.

== Chemistry ==
3D representation of rabeprazole spinning along an axis

Rabeprazole is classified as a substituted benzimidazole, like omeprazole, lansoprazole, and pantoprazole. Rabeprazole possess properties of both acids and bases, making it an amphotere. The acid dissociation constant (pK_{a}) of the pyridine nitrogen is about equal to 4.

=== Synthesis ===
Rabeprazole synthesis diagram

The above synthesis pathway begins with 2,3-dimethypyridine N-oxide (1). Nitration of 2,3-dimethylpyridine N-oxide affords the nitro derivative (the addition of NO_{2}) (2) The newly introduced nitro group is then displaced by the alkoxide from 3-methoxypropanol to yield the corresponding ether (3). Treatment with acetic anhydride results in the Polonovski reaction. Saponification followed by treatment with thionyl chloride then chlorinates the primary alcohol (5). Reaction with benzimidazole-2-thiol (6) followed by oxidation of the resulting thioether to the sulfoxide yields the final product: rabeprazole (8).

=== Comparative chemistry ===
The chemical structures in Table 2 illustrate the comparative chemistry of rabeprazole among other members of the PPI class. The structures vary by the substitution of side chains on either the benzimidazole or pyridine ring structures. Omeprazole, for example, has a methoxy moiety (CH_{3}O-) on the benzimidazole ring at position 5, whereas pantoprazole has a difluoromethoxy (CHF_{2}O-) chain at position 5. Lansoprazole has a trifluoroethoxy (CF_{3}-CH_{2}-O-) chain on the pyridine ring at position 4, whereas rabeprazole has a methoxypropoxy (CH_{3}-O-(CH_{2})_{3}-O-) chain at position 4. Esomeprazole and deslansoprazole represent stereoisomers of omeprazole and lansoprazole respectively.

PPI	Omeprazole	Esomeprazole	Lansoprazole
Chemical structure			

PPI	Dexlansoprazole	Pantoprazole	Rabeprazole
Chemical structure			

Table 2 | Comparative chemical structures of commercially available PPIs.

=== Physiochemical properties ===
Rabeprazole is characterized as a white to yellowish-white solid in its pure form. It is soluble in a number of solvents. Rabeprazole is very soluble in water and methanol, freely soluble in ethanol, chloroform, and ethyl acetate, and is insoluble in ether and n-hexane. It is unstable under humid conditions.

== History ==
Rabeprazole was first marketed in Europe in 1998. In 1999, one year later, rabeprazole was approved for use in the United States.

=== Development ===
Developed by Eisai Medical Research by the research names E3810 and LY307640, the pre-investigational new drug application was submitted on October 28, 1998. The final investigational new drug application was submitted August 6, 1999. On August 19, 1999, rabeprazole was approved in the US for multiple gastrointestinal indications. The approval for the treatment of symptomatic gastroesophageal reflux disease was on February 12, 2002.

== Society and culture ==
=== Legal status ===
Rabeprazole is approved in the United States and the United Kingdom for prescription use only. Rabeprazole was approved in India in December 2001. It was approved in Japan in 1997, and in all European Union member countries since.

=== Brand names ===
Rabeprazole has been sold in a number of brand names:

List of trade names for rabeprazole
Alphabet	Brand Name
A	Acera, Acifix, Acilesol, Aciphex, Acistal, Akirab, Algibra, An Si Fei, Anslag, Antuc, Apt, Aurizol-R
B	Bacanero, Barole, Bauzole, Bepra, Bepraz, Berazol, Berizar, Beryx
C	Cyra
D	Dexicool, Dexpure, Dirab, Domol
E	Eurorapi
F	Finix, Fodren
G	Gastech, Gastrazole, Gastrodine, Gelbra
H	Happi, Helirab, Heptadin
I	Idizole
J	Jelgrad, Ji Nuo
K	
L	
M	Mergium, Monrab
N	Neutracaine, Newrabell, Noflux
O	Olrite, Ontime, Oppi-R
P	Paliell, Paramet, Paricel, Pariet, Pepcia, Pepraz, Ppbest, Praber, Prabex, Prabexol, Prabez, Promto, Puloros
Q	
R	Rafron, R-Bit, R-Cid, R-PPI, R-Safe, R.P.Zole, Rabby, Rabe, Rabe-G, Rabeact-20, Rabec, Rabeca, Rabecell, Rabecis, Rabecole, Rabecom, Rabecon, Rabee, Rabefine, Rabegen, Rabekind, Rabelex, Rabelinz, Rabelis, Rabeloc, Rabeman, Rabemed, Rabeol, Rabeone, Rabep, Rabepazole, Rabephex, Rabeprazol, Rabeprazole, Rabeprazolo, Rabeprazolum, Rabesec, Rabestad, Rabetac, Rabetome, Rabetra, Rabetune, Rabeum, Rabex, Rabez, Rabez-FR, Rabezol, Rabezole, Rabibit, Rabicent, Rabicid, Rabicip, Rabifar, Rabifast, Rabilect, Rabip, Rabipot, Rabirol, Rabitab, Rabium, Rabiza, Rabizol, Rablet, Rablet-B, Rabon, Raboz, Rabroz, Rabyprex, Ragi, Ralic, Ramprozole, Raneks, Rap, Rapeed, Rapespes, Rapo, Rapoxol, Rasonix, Razid, Razit, Razo, Razodent, Razogard, Rebacip, Redura, Relitaz, Reorab, Reward, Rifcid, Rodesa, Rolant, Roll, Rowet, Rpraz, Rui Bo te, Rulcer
S	Setright, Staycool, Stom, Stomeck
T	
U	Ulceprazol, Ulcerostate
V	Value, Veloz
W	Wowrab
X	Xin Wei An
Y	Yu Tian Qing
Z	Zibepar, Zolpras, Zulbex

List of trade names for rabeprazole-containing combination products
Generic Combination	Brand Name
rabeprazole, amoxicillin, clarithromycin	Rabecure, Pylocure
rabeprazole, amoxicillin, metronidazole	Rabefine
rabeprazole, diclofenac	Drab, Rabin-DFX, Rclonac, Safediclo, Samurai
rabeprazole, domperidone	Acera-D, Acistal-D, Adec-R, Algibra-D, Anslag-D, Antuc-DSR, Biorab-DSR, Catrab-DSR, Comvine, Cyclochek, Cyra-D, Dirab-D, Domol-R, Esoga-RD, Gasonil-D, Gastrazole-D, Happi-D, Helirab-D, Kurab-DSR, Lorab-DSR, Neutraflux, Nuloc-D, Olrite-DSR, Parisec-DSR, Pepchek, Pepcia-D, Peraz-D, Ppbest-D, Prazim-RD, Prorab-D, R-Bit-DM, R-Bit-DSR, R-Cid Plus, R-DSR, R-Safe DSR, Rabby-DSR, Rabecis-DSR, Rabecom-D, Rabecon-DSR, Rabee-D, Rabefine-DSR, Rabelex-D, Rabemac-DSR, Rabep-DSR, Rabephex-D, Rabetome-DM, Rabetome-DSR, Rabetune-D, Rabex-D, Rabez-D, Rabi-DSR, Rabibit-D, Rabicent-D, Rabicip-D, Rabifast-DSR, Rabilect-DSR, Rabipot-D, Rabiprime-DSR, Rablet-D, Rabon-D, Rabon-DSR, Rabroz-DSR, Rabter-SR, Raizol-DSR, Rap-D, Rapeed-D, Rapo-DSR, Raz-DSR, Rebilex-DSR, Redoxid, Redura-D, Redura-DSR, Reorab-D, Reorab-DSR, Reward-D, Reward-DSR, Rifcid-D, Rifcid-DSR, Rifkool-DSR, Robilink-D, Rolant-D, Roll-D, Rpraz-D, Rugbi-DM, Rulcer-DSR, Setright-DSR, Sharaz-D, Staycool-DXR, Stomeck-D SR, Ulgo-DSR, Xenorab-DSR, Zolorab-D, Zomitac-DSR, Zorab-D
rabeprazole, itopride	Acera-IT, Antuc-IT, Cool Rab-IT, Happi-IT, Itopraz, Itorab, Jeprab-ITO, Pepraz-I, Rabee-ISR, Rabemac-ITR, Rabetome-ISR, Rabez-IT, Rabibit-ISR, Rablet-I, Rablet-IT, Rebilex-ISR, Reorab-IT, Rex-ISR, Rulcer-IT, Veloz-IT, and Zorite
rabeprazole, lafutidine	Lafumac Plus
rabeprazole, levosulpiride	Happi-L, Lorab-L, Rabekind Plus, Rabicent-L, Rabifast-XL, Rabin-LXR, Rabinta-L, Rabitem-LS, Robiwel-L, Roll-LS, Wokride
rabeprazole, ondansetron	Ond-R, Rulcer-ON
rabeprazole, polaprezinc	Happi-XT, Rabez-Z
rabeprazole, sodium bicarbonate	Pepcia-FF, Raizol

== Research ==
An alternative formulation of rabeprazole, termed "rabeprazole-ER" (extended release) has been developed. The purpose of the formulation was to increase the half-life of rabeprazole, which normally is very short in humans. Rabeprazole-ER was a 50 mg capsule composed of five non-identical 10 mg tablets that were designed to release rabeprazole at differing intervals throughout the gastrointestinal system. However, because two high quality clinical trials failed to demonstrate a benefit of rabeprazole-ER versus esomeprazole (another common PPI) for healing grade C or D erosive esophagitis, the development of rabeprazole-ER ceased.
