= Azeloprazole =

Chemical compound

Clinical data
- Other names: Z-215; E3710
- Drug class: Proton pump inhibitor

Legal status
- Legal status: Investigational

Identifiers
- IUPAC name: 2-[(R)-[4-[(2,2-dimethyl-1,3-dioxan-5-yl)methoxy]-3,5-dimethyl-2-pyridinyl]methylsulfinyl]-1H-benzimidazole
- CAS Number: 955095-45-1 955095-50-8 (potassium salt)
- PubChem CID: 17747247
- DrugBank: DB20944
- ChemSpider: 10175679
- UNII: MIR2G6L61B
- ChEMBL: ChEMBL4300945
- CompTox Dashboard (EPA): DTXSID50241865

Chemical and physical data
- Formula: C_{22}H_{27}N_{3}O_{4}S
- Molar mass: 429.54 g·mol^{−1}
- 3D model (JSmol): Interactive image
- SMILES: CC1=CN=C(C(=C1OCC2COC(OC2)(C)C)C)C[S@@](=O)C3=NC4=CC=CC=C4N3
- InChI: InChI=1S/C22H27N3O4S/c1-14-9-23-19(13-30(26)21-24-17-7-5-6-8-18(17)25-21)15(2)20(14)27-10-16-11-28-22(3,4)29-12-16/h5-9,16H,10-13H2,1-4H3,(H,24,25)/t30-/m1/s1; Key:DWDKHTXMLSZGDL-SSEXGKCCSA-N

Azeloprazole (also known as Z-215 or E3710) is a drug under investigation for acid-related medical conditions responsive to suppressing the production of stomach acid. It is considered a member of the proton pump inhibitor class of medications.

== Medical uses ==
Azeloprazole is an acid suppressing drug being studied for the treatment of gastroesophageal reflux disease (GERD).

== Pharmacology ==
=== Mechanism of action ===
Azeloprazole, like other drugs of the proton pump inhibitor class, works by inhibiting the hydrogen potassium adenosine triphosphatase (H^{+}/K^{+} ATPase) acid pump. The term "proton pump inhibitor" comes from the recognition of hydrogen cations as a single proton. H^{+}/K^{+} ATPase pumps, found in parietal cells in the stomach, are ultimately responsible for secreting acid into the lumen of the stomach. By inhibiting the secretion of acid, proton pump inhibitors are considered useful in treating "acid-related diseases" (e.g. gastroesophageal reflux disease).

== Chemistry ==
Azeloprazole is soluble in DMSO.

== History ==
Azeloprazole was designed in Japan with pharmacogenomics in mind. Some drugs in the proton pump inhibitor class are metabolized by the hepatic enzyme CYP2C19. Some individuals, such as people of Japanese ancestry, are more likely to be poor CYP2C19 metabolizers; that is, their ability to metabolize certain drugs through CYP2C19 is compromised by a genetic mutation in one or both copies of the CYP2C19 gene that renders the enzyme nonfunctional or less functional. Azeloprazole was designed to avoid CYP2C19 metabolism entirely, thereby avoiding pharmacogenomic issues with poor CYP2C19 metabolizers.

Azeloprazole was designed by the Japanese pharmaceutical company Eisai Co Ltd.

== Society and culture ==
=== Legal status ===
In the United States, proton pump inhibitors are found both over the counter and by prescription. However, azeloprazole is not FDA approved in the United States.

== Research ==
Azeloprazole completed phase II clinical trials for erosive esophagitis in Japan in 2017, and phase II clinical trials for GERD in the United States in 2016.
