= Fexuprazan =

Chemical compound

Clinical data
- Trade names: Fexuclue
- Other names: Abeprazan; DWP14012; DWP-14012
- ATC code: A02BC10 (WHO)

Legal status
- Legal status: Rx in South Korea, Mexico

Identifiers
- IUPAC name: 1-[5-(2,4-Difluorophenyl)-1-(3-fluorophenyl)sulfonyl-4-methoxypyrrol-3-yl]-N-methylmethanamine
- CAS Number: 1902954-60-2
- PubChem CID: 122662112
- DrugBank: DB16078
- ChemSpider: 68006985
- UNII: BE52S2C1QT
- KEGG: D13012
- ChEMBL: ChEMBL4594445

Chemical and physical data
- Formula: C_{19}H_{17}F_{3}N_{2}O_{3}S
- Molar mass: 410.41 g·mol^{−1}
- 3D model (JSmol): Interactive image
- SMILES: CNCC1=CN(C(=C1OC)C2=C(C=C(C=C2)F)F)S(=O)(=O)C3=CC=CC(=C3)F
- InChI: InChI=1S/C19H17F3N2O3S/c1-23-10-12-11-24(28(25,26)15-5-3-4-13(20)8-15)18(19(12)27-2)16-7-6-14(21)9-17(16)22/h3-9,11,23H,10H2,1-2H3; Key:OUNXGNDVWVPCOL-UHFFFAOYSA-N

Fexuprazan (trade name Fexuclue) is a drug for the treatment of gastroesophageal reflux disease (GERD). It is a potassium-competitive acid blocker, which is a class of drugs suppressing gastric acids.

Fexuprazan is approved for clinical use in South Korea, Mexico, Philippines, Chile, and Ecuador.
