= Linaprazan =

Pharmaceutical molecule

Clinical data
- Other names: AZD-0865

Legal status
- Legal status: Investigational

Identifiers
- IUPAC name: 8-[(2,6-Dimethylphenyl)methylamino]-N-(2-hydroxyethyl)-2,3-dimethylimidazo[1,2-a]pyridine-6-carboxamide
- CAS Number: 248919-64-4
- PubChem CID: 9951066
- ChemSpider: 8126677
- UNII: E0OU4SC8DP
- ChEMBL: ChEMBL497011

Chemical and physical data
- Formula: C_{21}H_{26}N_{4}O_{2}
- Molar mass: 366.465 g·mol^{−1}

Linaprazan is an experimental drug for the treatment of gastroesophageal reflux disease (GERD). Unlike the proton-pump inhibitors (PPIs) which are typically used to treat GERD, linaprazan is a potassium-competitive acid blocker (P-CAB). Linaprazan was developed by AstraZeneca, but it was not successful in clinical trials.

The drug was then licensed to Cinclus Pharma, which is now investigating linaprazan glurate, a prodrug of linaprazan which is expected to have a longer biological half-life than linaprazan itself.

Chemical structure of linaprazan glurate
