= C16H14F3N3O2S =

The molecular formula C_{16}H_{14}F_{3}N_{3}O_{2}S (molar mass: 369.363 g/mol) may refer to:

- Dexlansoprazole
- Lansoprazole
