= Zastaprazan =

Medication

Clinical data
- Trade names: Jaqbo
- Other names: JP-1366
- ATC code: A02BC12 (WHO)

Legal status
- Legal status: KR: Rx-only

Identifiers
- IUPAC name: azetidin-1-yl-[8-[(2,6-dimethylphenyl)methylamino]-2,3-dimethylimidazo[1,2-a]pyridin-6-yl]methanone
- CAS Number: 2133852-18-1
- PubChem CID: 138622158
- ChemSpider: 115007138
- UNII: W9S9KZX5MD
- KEGG: D13240

Chemical and physical data
- Formula: C_{22}H_{26}N_{4}O
- Molar mass: 362.477 g·mol^{−1}
- 3D model (JSmol): Interactive image
- SMILES: CC1=C(C(=CC=C1)C)CNC2=CC(=CN3C2=NC(=C3C)C)C(=O)N4CCC4
- InChI: InChI=1S/C22H26N4O/c1-14-7-5-8-15(2)19(14)12-23-20-11-18(22(27)25-9-6-10-25)13-26-17(4)16(3)24-21(20)26/h5,7-8,11,13,23H,6,9-10,12H2,1-4H3; Key:FEQFUBYYZYQTOJ-UHFFFAOYSA-N

Zastaprazan (trade name Jaqbo) is a pharmaceutical drug for gastrointestinal disorders. It is classified as a potassium-competitive acid blocker. In April 2024, it was approved for use in South Korea for the treatment of erosive gastroesophageal reflux disease (GERD). In addition, it is in Phase III clinical trials for gastric ulcer and peptic ulcer.
