= Keverprazan =

Chemical compound

Clinical data
- Other names: Keprason

Legal status
- Legal status: Rx in China

Identifiers
- IUPAC name: 1-[5-(2-fluorophenyl)-1-[3-(3-methoxypropoxy)phenyl]sulfonylpyrrol-3-yl]-N-methylmethanamine or 1-(5-(2-fluorophenyl)-1-(3-(3-methoxypropoxy)phenyl)sulfonylpyrrol-3-yl)-N-methylmethanamine
- CAS Number: 1978371-23-1
- PubChem CID: 1088056
- IUPHAR/BPS: 12653
- UNII: SOC12UY3ZP

Chemical and physical data
- Formula: C_{22}H_{25}FN_{2}O_{4}S
- Molar mass: 432.51 g·mol^{−1}
- 3D model (JSmol): Interactive image
- SMILES: CNCC1=CN(C(=C1)C2=CC=CC=C2F)S(=O)(=O)C3=CC=CC(=C3)OCCCOC
- InChI: InChI=1S/C22H25FN2O4S/c1-24-15-17-13-22(20-9-3-4-10-21(20)23)25(16-17)30(26,27)19-8-5-7-18(14-19)29-12-6-11-28-2/h3-5,7-10,13-14,16,24H,6,11-12,15H2,1-2H3; Key:UDHVRDAZIAGHFG-UHFFFAOYSA-N

Keverprazan is a drug for the treatment of duodenal ulcers, gastroesophageal reflux disease (GERD), and H. pylori eradication. It is approved for clinical use in China.
