= Revaprazan =

Medication used to treat gastritis

Clinical data
- Trade names: Revanex
- Other names: YH1885
- ATC code: None

Identifiers
- IUPAC name: N-(4-Fluorophenyl)-4,5-dimethyl-6-(1-methyl-3,4-dihydro-2(1H)-isoquinolinyl)-2-pyrimidinamine
- CAS Number: 199463-33-7
- PubChem CID: 204104
- ChemSpider: 176801
- UNII: 5P184180P5
- CompTox Dashboard (EPA): DTXSID10870216

Chemical and physical data
- Formula: C_{22}H_{23}FN_{4}
- Molar mass: 362.452 g·mol^{−1}
- 3D model (JSmol): Interactive image
- SMILES: c1cc(F)ccc1Nc2nc(C)c(C)c(n2)N3CCc4ccccc4C3C
- InChI: InChI=1S/C22H23FN4/c1-14-15(2)24-22(25-19-10-8-18(23)9-11-19)26-21(14)27-13-12-17-6-4-5-7-20(17)16(27)3/h4-11,16H,12-13H2,1-3H3,(H,24,25,26); Key:LECZXZOBEZITCL-UHFFFAOYSA-N

Revaprazan (trade name Revanex) is a drug that reduces gastric acid secretion which is used for the treatment of gastritis. It acts as an acid pump antagonist (potassium-competitive acid blocker). Revaprazan is approved for use in South Korea, but is not approved in Europe or the United States.

== See also ==
- Vonoprazan
