= Pantoprazole =

Stomach acid suppressing medication

- Molecular structure of pantoprazole

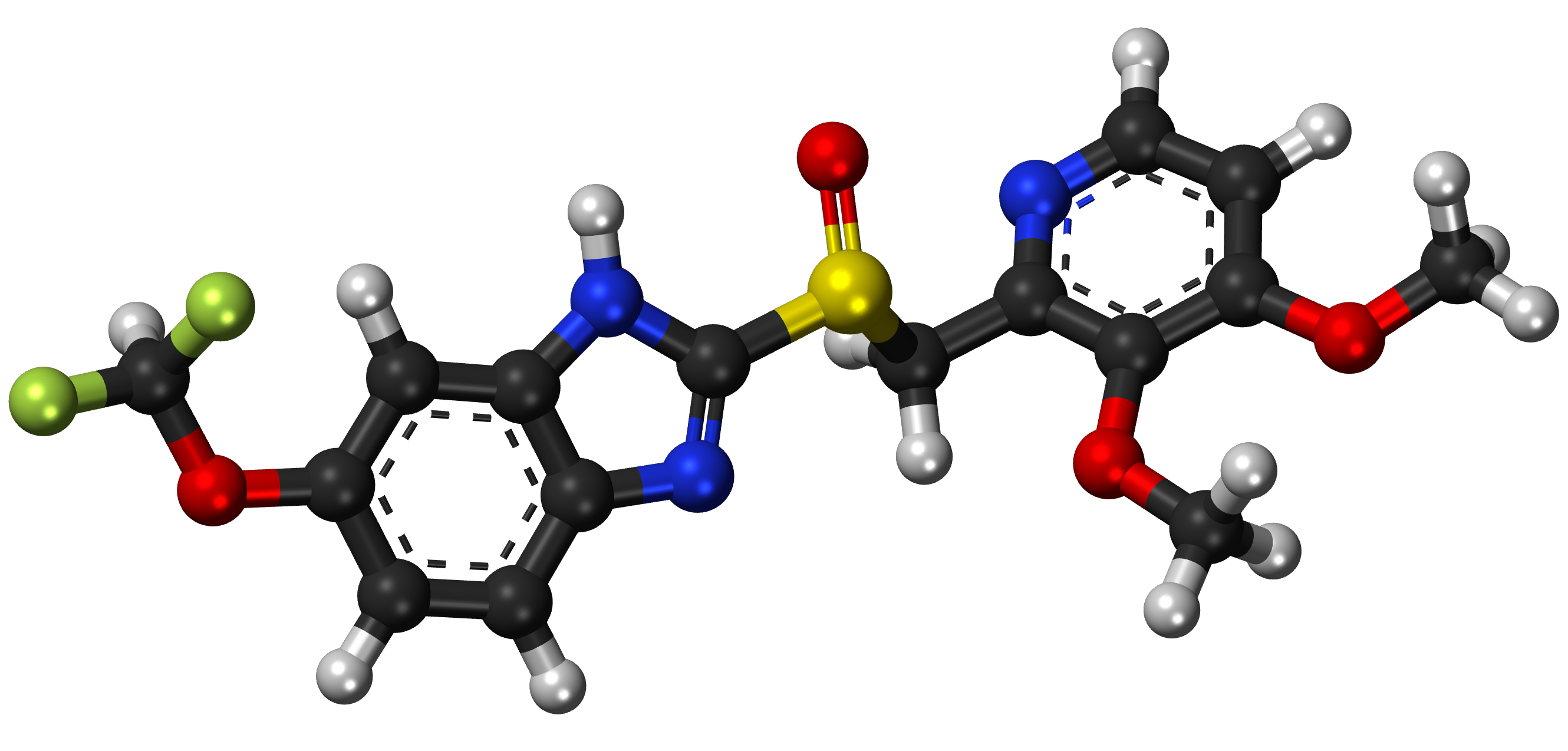
- 3D representation of a pantoprazole molecule

Clinical data
- Trade names: Protonix, others
- AHFS/Drugs.com: Monograph
- MedlinePlus: a601246
- License data: US DailyMed: Pantoprazole
- Pregnancy category: AU: B3
- Routes of administration: By mouth and intravenous
- Drug class: Proton-pump inhibitor
- ATC code: A02BC02 (WHO) A02BD04 (WHO) A02BD11 (WHO)

Legal status
- Legal status: AU: S4 (Prescription only) / S2; UK: POM (Prescription only); US: ℞-only; EU: Rx-only / OTC; In general: ℞ (Prescription only)

Pharmacokinetic data
- Bioavailability: 77%
- Protein binding: 98%
- Metabolism: Liver (CYP2C19, CYP3A4)
- Elimination half-life: 1–2 hours
- Excretion: Urine, feces

Identifiers
- IUPAC name: (RS)-6-(Difluoromethoxy)-2-[(3,4-dimethoxypyridin-2-yl)methylsulfinyl]-1H-benzo[d]imidazole
- CAS Number: 102625-70-7
- PubChem CID: 4679
- IUPHAR/BPS: 7260
- DrugBank: DB00213
- ChemSpider: 4517
- UNII: D8TST4O562
- KEGG: D05353
- ChEBI: CHEBI:7915
- ChEMBL: ChEMBL1502
- CompTox Dashboard (EPA): DTXSID4023416
- ECHA InfoCard: 100.111.005

Chemical and physical data
- Formula: C_{16}H_{15}F_{2}N_{3}O_{4}S
- Molar mass: 383.37 g·mol^{−1}
- 3D model (JSmol): Interactive image
- Chirality: Racemic
- SMILES: FC(F)Oc1ccc2[nH]c(nc2c1)S(=O)Cc3nccc(OC)c3OC
- InChI: InChI=1S/C16H15F2N3O4S/c1-23-13-5-6-19-12(14(13)24-2)8-26(22)16-20-10-4-3-9(25-15(17)18)7-11(10)21-16/h3-7,15H,8H2,1-2H3,(H,20,21); Key:IQPSEEYGBUAQFF-UHFFFAOYSA-N

Pantoprazole, sold under the brand name Protonix, among others, is a proton pump inhibitor medication used for the treatment of stomach ulcers, short-term treatment of erosive esophagitis due to gastroesophageal reflux disease (GERD), maintenance of healing of erosive esophagitis, and pathological hypersecretory conditions including Zollinger–Ellison syndrome. It may also be used along with other medications to eliminate Helicobacter pylori. Pantoprazole is a proton-pump inhibitor (PPI) and its effectiveness is similar to that of other PPIs. It is available by mouth and by injection into a vein.

Common side effects include headaches, diarrhea, abdominal pain, and joint pain. More serious side effects may include severe allergic reactions, a type of chronic inflammation known as atrophic gastritis, Clostridioides difficile colitis, low magnesium, and vitamin B12 deficiency. Use in pregnancy appears to be safe. Pantoprazole is a proton pump inhibitor that decreases gastric acid secretion. It works by inactivating (H+/K+)-ATPase function in the stomach.

The study of pantoprazole began in 1985, and it came into medical use in Germany in 1994. It is available as a generic medication. In 2024, it was the sixteenth most commonly prescribed medication in the United States, with more than 34 million prescriptions. In Australia, it was one of the top ten most prescribed medications between 2017 and 2023.

== Medical uses ==
Pantoprazole is used for short-term treatment of erosion and ulceration of the esophagus for adults and children five years of age and older caused by gastroesophageal reflux disease. It can be used as a maintenance therapy for long-term use after initial response is obtained, but there have not been any controlled studies about the use of pantoprazole past a duration of 12 months. Pantoprazole may also be used in combination with antibiotics to treat ulcers caused by Helicobacter pylori. It can also be used for long-term treatment of Zollinger-Ellison syndrome. It may be used to prevent gastric ulcers in those taking NSAIDs.

For improved efficacy of pantoprazole, the oral tablet formulation is taken half an hour prior to ingestion of food. In the hospital, intravenous administration is indicated when patients are unable to take the medication by mouth.

=== Children ===
Pantoprazole is only indicated for the short-term treatment of erosive esophagitis in children ages seven and older; and the safety and effectiveness of pantoprazole have only been established in the treatment of erosive esophagitis in children.

== Adverse effects ==
=== Infection ===
Stomach acid plays a role in killing ingested bacteria. Use of pantoprazole may increase the chance of developing infections such as pneumonia, particularly in hospitalized patients.

=== Elderly ===
The incidence of adverse effects occurring in people aged 65 years and older was similar to that in people aged 65 years and less.

=== Pregnancy ===
In reproductive studies using doses largely greater than the recommended doses performed on rats and rabbits, there was no evident harm on the development of the baby.

=== Breast feeding ===
Pantoprazole has been found to pass through the breast milk. Additionally, in rodent cancer studies, pantoprazole has been shown to potentially cause tumor growth. The clinical relevance of the finding is unknown, but risks and benefits are recommended for consideration in determining the use of therapy for the mother and child.

=== Common ===
- Gastrointestinal: abdominal pain (6%), diarrhea (9%), flatulence (4%), nausea (7%), vomiting (4%)
- Neurologic: headache (12%), dizziness (3%)
- Neuromuscular and skeletal: arthralgia (3%)

=== Rare ===
- Gastrointestinal: constipation, dry mouth, hepatitis
- Blood problems: low white blood cell count, thrombocytopenia
- Immunologic: Stevens–Johnson syndrome, toxic epidermal necrolysis
- Metabolic: elevated creatine kinase, elevated cholesterol levels, elevated liver enzymes (AST/ALT), swelling
- Musculoskeletal: Muscle disorders, bone fracture and infection, Clostridioides difficile infection, osteoporosis-related hip fracture, rhabdomyolysis
- Kidneys: interstitial nephritis
- Nutrition: may reduce the absorption of important nutrients, vitamins, and minerals, including certain medications, leaving users at increased risk for pneumonia.

=== Long-term use ===
- Osteoporosis and bone fracture have been observed in people on high-dose and/or long-term (over one year) prescription proton pump inhibitors.
- Hypomagnesia has been observed in people on medications like pantoprazole when taken for longer periods of time (generally one year or more, although cases have been reported with regimens as short as three months).
- Deficiencies such as vitamin B12 deficiency, iron deficiency, and calcium deficiency may be seen with long term use. Vitamin B12 deficiency is due to the change in the acidic environment within the stomach with the use of pantoprazole which prevents peptidases from being activated. This prevents the cleaving of R-factor from vitamin B12 and prevents its absorption.
- Rebound hypergastrinemia may be seen when stopping the medication after long term use.

=== Discontinuation ===
In people taking PPIs for longer than six months, a dose taper is recommended prior to discontinuation.

== Interactions ==
Due to its effect of reducing stomach acidity, use of pantoprazole can affect absorption of drugs that are pH-sensitive, such as ampicillin esters, ketoconazole, atazanavir, iron salts, amphetamine and mycophenolate mofetil. Additional medications that are affected include bisphosphonate derivatives, fluconazole, clopidogrel, and methotrexate.

== Pharmacology ==
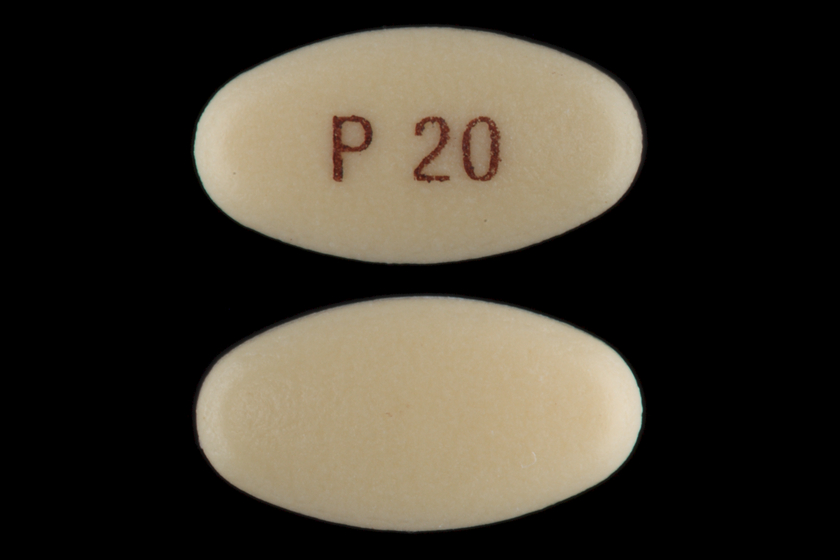
Wyeth pantoprazole 20 mg (Protonix®)

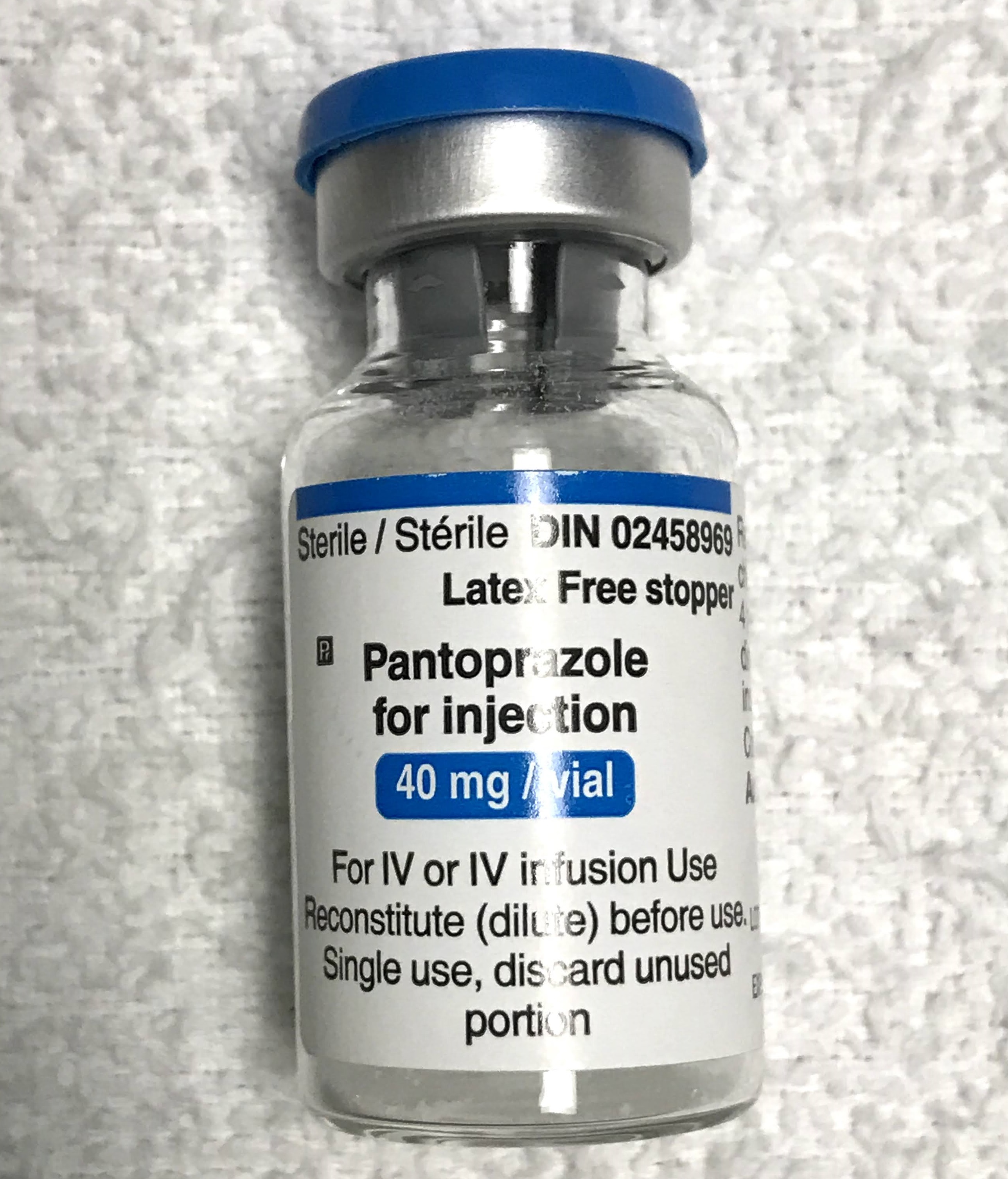
Vial of generic pantoprazole for IV administration

The mechanism of action of pantoprazole is to inhibit the final step in gastric acid production. In the gastric parietal cell of the stomach, pantoprazole covalently binds to the H+/K+ ATP pump to inhibit gastric acid and basal acid secretion. The covalent binding prevents acid secretion for up to 24 hours and longer.

Pantoprazole is metabolized in the liver by the cytochrome P450 system. Metabolism mainly consists of demethylation by CYP2C19 followed by sulfation. Another metabolic pathway is oxidation by CYP3A4. Pantoprazole metabolites are not thought to have any pharmacological significance. It is usually given with a prokinetic drug because of inactivity in the acidic environment of the stomach. Pantoprazole binds irreversibly to H+K+ATPase (proton pumps) to suppress the secretion of acid. Due to irreversible binding of the pumps, new pumps have to be made before acid production can be resumed. The drug's plasma half-life is about two hours. After administration, the time for the drug to reach peak plasma concentrations is 2 to 3 hours. The percentage of the drug that is protein bound is 98%.

== History ==
Pantoprazole was discovered by scientists at Byk Gulden, a subsidiary of Altana; the drug discovery program started in 1980, producing pantoprazole in 1985. The compound was actually created by chemists working to scale up a different chemical that had been chosen as a development candidate. Byk Gulden partnered with Smith Kline & French in 1984. The compound's development names were BY1029 and SK&F96022. By 1986 the companies had created the sodium salt, pantoprazole sodium sesquihydrate, and decided to develop it as it was more soluble and stable, and was more compatible with other ingredients used in the formulation. It was first marketed in Germany in 1994. Wyeth licensed the US patent from Altana, and obtained marketing approval from the US FDA in 2000 under the trade name Protonix.

In 2004, worldwide sales of the drug were $3.65 billion, about half of which were in the US.

In 2007, Altana's drug business was acquired by Nycomed. Nycomed was in turn acquired by Takeda in 2011 and Wyeth was acquired by Pfizer in 2009.

The patent protecting the drug was set to expire in 2010, but Teva Pharmaceuticals filed an Abbreviated New Drug Application (ANDA) in 2007, and Wyeth and Nycomed sued Teva for patent infringement, but Teva decided to launch its generic drug "at risk" that year, before the patent had been invalidated. Wyeth launched an authorized generic in 2008. Pfizer and Takeda's patent exclusivity expired in 2010, and an administrative exclusivity they had for pediatric use expired in January 2011, and full generic competition began. The litigation between Teva and Pfizer/Takeda was settled in 2013, with Teva paying the patent holders $2.15 billion in damages for its early launch.

== Society and culture ==
As of 2017, the drug was marketed under many brands worldwide, including as a combination drug with domperidone, a combination with itopride, in combination with both clarithromycin and amoxicillin, in combination with levosulpiride, and in combination with naproxen.

List of brand names

As of 2017, it was marketed under many brands worldwide, including: Acernix, Aciban, Acida, Acido-X, Acidrol, Acidwell, Acilib, Acilibre, Acillect, Acipan, Acrid, Alapanzol, Amphoter, Anagastra, Anesteloc, Antaxid, Antopral, Anulacid, Anxel, Apazol, Appryo, Aptizole, Apton, Armcid, Asoprazole, Aspan, Aurizol-P, Awamed, Azatol, Biotop V, Brandocare, Branzol, Buffet, Buscopan Reflusso, Caprol, Ciprazol, Citrel, Clessol, Comenazol, Conoran, Contix, Contracid, Contraflux, Contro-Cap, Controloc, Cool Pan, Delpanto EC, Digene Total, Digespan, Dosanloc, Empaflun, Eracid, Erprazol, Esopan, Eupantol, Exopan, Extream, Extreme, F-Pan, Farmazol, Fenix, Fexmor, Fu Shi Tan, Fulpan, Fupan, Gastblok, Gastenz, Gastrazol-L, Gastriwin, Gastrolan, Gastroloc, Gastromax, Gastronorm, Gastroprozal, Gastrostad, Gastrowell, Gastrozol, Gerdamegh, Gerprazol, Gesoflux, Gondea, Gopan, Hansazol, Hasanloc, Helix, Iboprot, Inipant, Inipepsia, Inipomp, IPP, Ippracid, Ipraalox, Kaiji, Kairol, Letopra, Loxanto, Luoxu, Lupipan, Maalox, Mag, Manez, Marozel, Monpan, Nelgast, Nexpan, Noacid, Noacid, Nolpaza, Normogastrol, Noxadif, Ntap, Nuosen, Nupenta, Oritop, Osipan, Ozepran, Ozpan, Ozzion, P-20, P-40, P-Bit, P-OD, P-PPI, P-Zole, Pacid, Paciddia, Palio, Palmy, Pamel, Pamtrazol, Pamyl, Pan, Panbloc, Pancleus, Pancrazio, Pandev, Pane, Panfast, Pangest, Panglen, Panlan, Panlisu, Panloc, Panloz, Panmeilu, Panocer, Panogastin, Panopaz, Panor, Panoral, Panore, Panpot, Panpra, Panprabene, Panprax, Panprazol, Panprazox, Panpro, Panproton, Panpure, Panrazol, Panrazole, Panrbe, Panref, Pansa, Pansec, Panso, Pantac, Pantacid, Pantact, Pantagi, Pantakind, Pantaltius, Pantap, Pantasur, Pantaz, Pantazol, Pantecta, Pantex, Pantexel, Pantezol, Panthec, Panthron, Pantid, Pantin, Pantip, Pantium, Panto, Panto-Denk, Panto-Gas, Pantobex, Pantoc, Pantocal, Pantocar, Pantocare, Pantocas, Pantocer, Pantocid, Pantocim, Pantocom, Pantocure, Pantodac, Pantodar, Pantofin, Pantofir, Pantogastrix, Pantogen, Pantogerolan, PantoJenson, Pantokem, Pantokool, Pantolax, Pantoline, Pantoloc, Pantolok, Pantolup, Pantomax, Pantomed, Pantometylentina, Pantomyl, Pantonis, Pantonix, Pantop, Pantopacid, Pantopan, Pantopaz, Pantopep, Pantopi, Pantopra-Q, Pantopraz, Pantoprazal, Pantoprazol, Pantoprazole, Pantoprazolo, Pantoprazolum, Pantoprem, Pantoprix, Pantoprol, Pantopump, Pantor, Pantorc, Pantoren, Pantorica, Pantosal, Pantosan, Pantosec, Pantosid, Pantostad, Pantotab, Pantotis, Pantover, Pantoz, Pantozim, Pantozol, Pantozole, Pantpas, Pantra, Pantrol, Pantroz, Pantul, Pantune, Pantus, Panveda, Panvell, Panz, Panzat, Panzel, Panzilan, Panzilan, Panzol, Panzole, Panzor, Parastamic, Paz, Peblo, Penkool, Penlip, Pentalink, Pentastar, Pentowin, Pentoz, Pentozed, Peploc, Peptac, Peptazol, Peptazole, Pepticaid, Pepticool, Peptix, Peptoloc, Pepzol, Perloc, Pipanzin, Pozola, Praize, Pranza, Praz-Up, Prazobloc, Prazocid, Prazolacid, Prazolan, Prazole, Prazolpan, Prazopant, Pregel, Prevacid, Previfect, Previfect, Progen, Prolex, Promtec, Propanz, Protech, Protinum, Protium, Protocent, Protocid, Protofix, Protoloc, Proton, Proton-P, Protonex, Protonil, Protonix, Protopan, PTA, Pulcet, Pumpisel, Ranloc, Razon, Rcpan, Redacib, Refluxine, Refluxopan, rifun, Ripane, Roxitrol, Sedipanto, Segregam, Seltraz, Sipar, Sodac, Somac, Sozol, Stamic, Stomafor, Stripole, Sumipral, Supacid, Super OM, Suppi, Supracam, Supracid, Surmera, Tai Mei Ni Ke, Tecta, Tonval, Topazol, Topra, Topraz, Topzole, Toraflux, Tropaz, Trupan, Ulceron, Ulcoreks, Ulcotenal, Ulprix, Ulsepan, Ulstop, Ultop, Ultoz, Unigastrozol, Vencid, Ventro-Pant, Vomizole, Wei Di, Wei Ke An, Wonon, Xotepic, Yoevid, Zamotil, Zaprol, Zencopan, Zgaton, Zimpax, Zipant, Zipantol, Zipantola, Ziprol, Zolan, Zolemer, Zolpan, Zolpanz, Zolpra, Zoltex, Zoltum, Zontop, Zoprax, Zovanta, Zurcal, and Zurcazol.

It was marketed as a combination drug with domperidone under the brand names Aciban-DSR, Acillect-DSR, Asoprazole-D, Buffet-DXR, Depam, Domelong P, Dycizol, Eracid-D, F-Pan DSR, Fulpan-D, Fulpan-DSR, Gerdom, Gi-Fri, Gopan-D, Gopan-DSR, GR8-OD, Kurepane-DSR, Latop-D, Monpan-D, Monpan-DSR, Nupenta-DSR, Odipan-DSR, Oritop-D, Oritop-DSR, P-Bit-D, P-Bit-DSR, P-Zole DSR, P-Zole-D, PAA-DSR, Palio-D, Pamtrazol-D, Pan-D, Pancrazio-DSR, Pandiff, Pandostal, Pandostal-OD, Panfast-DSR, Panopaz-D, Panor-D, Panpot-DSR, Pansa-D, Pantact-D, Pantin-D, Pantin-RD, Pantocar-D, Pantocom-D, Pantoflux, Pantojoy-DXR, Pantokool-D, Pantolex-DS, Pantopacid-D, Pantopacid-SR, Pantorica-D, Pantozol-D, Pantozol-DSR, Pantra-D, Pantune-D, Panveda-D, Panzo-D, Panzol Plus, Panzol-D, Paz-DN, Peblo-D, Peblo-DSR, Penkool-DSR, Penlip-D, Pentalink-D, Pentastar-D, Pentozed-D, Peptac D, Peptac DSR, Pepticool-DXR, Pintel-DSR, Pop-DSR, Praize-D, Praize-D Forte, Prazole Plus, Prazosan-DSR, Predom, Predom-OD, Prolex-DSR, Prolus-DSR, Protocent-DSR, Protopan-D, Protopan-H, Ripane-D, Ripane-DSR, Trazol-DSR, PTA-D, Ulcicap-PD, Ultop DSR, Ultoz-D, Wonon-D, Wonon-DSR, and Zovanta-D.

It was marketed in combination with itopride under the brand names Ganaton Total, Kurepan-IT, Nupenta-ITR, P-Bit-ISR, Pepnil-ITO, Prolus-ISR, and Protopan-I.

It was marketed in combination with clarithromycin and amoxicillin as Gastrocomb, Klacid Hp7, Panclamox, and ZacPac.

It was marketed in combination with levosulpiride as Panlife-LS and in combination with naproxen as Arthopan.

== Veterinary use ==
In veterinary medicine, pantoprazole appears to be safe to use in several large animal species. The pharmacokinetics of pantoprazole have been explored in several veterinary species, including calves, alpacas and foals with half lives reported as 2.81, 0.47, and 1.43 hours, respectively. Pantoprazole appears to be eliminated more quickly in goats when compared to calves, with goats having an elimination half-life of less than one hour.

Pantoprazole has been demonstrated to increase the 3rd compartment pH in alpacas. It has been shown to be generally safe to use in cattle, sheep and goats. The subcutaneous bioavailability is greater than 100% in calves. In calves intravenous and subcutaneous administration has been shown to significantly elevate abomasal pH.
