= Tenatoprazole =

Chemical compound

Clinical data
- Routes of administration: Oral
- ATC code: none

Pharmacokinetic data
- Metabolism: Hepatic (CYP2C19-mediated)
- Elimination half-life: 4.8 to 7.7 hours

Identifiers
- IUPAC name: 5-methoxy-2-[(4-methoxy-3,5-dimethylpyridin-2-yl)methylsulfinyl]-1H-imidazo[4,5-b]pyridine
- CAS Number: 113712-98-4
- PubChem CID: 636411
- ChemSpider: 552196
- UNII: RE0689TX2K
- CompTox Dashboard (EPA): DTXSID1046687
- ECHA InfoCard: 100.120.697

Chemical and physical data
- Formula: C_{16}H_{18}N_{4}O_{3}S
- Molar mass: 346.41 g·mol^{−1}
- 3D model (JSmol): Interactive image
- Chirality: Racemic mixture
- SMILES: Cc1c(OC)c(C)cnc1CS(=O)c2[nH]c3ccc(OC)nc3n2
- InChI: InChI=1S/C16H18N4O3S/c1-9-7-17-12(10(2)14(9)23-4)8-24(21)16-18-11-5-6-13(22-3)19-15(11)20-16/h5-7H,8H2,1-4H3,(H,18,19,20); Key:ZBFDAUIVDSSISP-UHFFFAOYSA-N

Tenatoprazole is a proton pump inhibitor drug candidate that was undergoing clinical testing as a potential treatment for reflux oesophagitis and peptic ulcer as far back as 2003. The compound was invented by Mitsubishi Tanabe Pharma and was licensed to Negma Laboratories (part of Wockhardt as of 2007).

Mitsubishi reported that tenatoprazole was still in Phase I clinical trials in 2007 and again in 2012.

Tenatoprazole has an imidazopyridine ring in place of the benzimidazole moiety found in other proton pump inhibitors, and has a half-life about seven times longer than other PPIs.

== See also ==
- Imidazopyridine
