= Timoprazole =

Chemical compound

Identifiers
- IUPAC name: 2-[(2-Pyridylmethyl)sulfinyl]-1H-benzimidazole
- CAS Number: 57237-97-5
- PubChem CID: 72171
- ChemSpider: 65144
- UNII: 95H6S1X9CC
- KEGG: D05900
- CompTox Dashboard (EPA): DTXSID40866622

Chemical and physical data
- Formula: C_{13}H_{11}N_{3}OS
- Molar mass: 257.31 g·mol^{−1}
- 3D model (JSmol): Interactive image
- SMILES: n1ccccc1CS(=O)c2[nH]c3ccccc3n2
- InChI: InChI=1S/C13H11N3OS/c17-18(9-10-5-3-4-8-14-10)13-15-11-6-1-2-7-12(11)16-13/h1-8H,9H2,(H,15,16); Key:HBDKFZNDMVLSHM-UHFFFAOYSA-N

Timoprazole is in a class of medications called proton pump inhibitors (PPI) that inhibit gastric acid secretion. While it has never come to market, it was studied early on and is considered to be the "backbone" of the PPI class that succeeded it. This medication has high anti-secretory activity, which flared interest along with its simple structure.
