= Proton-pump inhibitor =

Class of drugs for reducing stomach acid

- Drug class
- General structure of a proton-pump inhibitor

Class identifiers
- Use: Reduction of gastric acid production
- ATC code: A02BC
- Mechanism of action: Enzyme inhibitor
- Biological target: H^{+}/K^{+} ATPase

Clinical data
- Drugs.com: Drug Classes
- WebMD: MedicineNet

External links
- MeSH: D054328

Legal status

Proton-pump inhibitors (PPIs) are a class of medications that cause a profound and prolonged reduction of stomach acid production. They do so by irreversibly inhibiting the stomach's H^{+}/K^{+} ATPase proton pump. The body eventually synthesizes new proton pumps to replace the irreversibly inhibited ones—a process driven by normal cellular turnover, which gradually restores acid production.

Proton-pump inhibitors have largely superseded the H_{2}-receptor antagonists, a group of medications with similar effects but a different mode of action, and heavy use of antacids. Potassium-competitive acid blockers (PCABs) have entered the market since the 2010s.

PPIs are among the most widely sold medications in the world. The class of proton-pump inhibitor medications is on the World Health Organization's List of Essential Medicines, omeprazole being the specific listed example.

== Medical uses ==
These medications are used in the treatment of many conditions, such as:

- Dyspepsia
- Peptic ulcer disease including after endoscopic treatment for bleeding
- As part of Helicobacter pylori eradication therapy
- Gastroesophageal reflux disease (GERD or GORD) including symptomatic endoscopy-negative reflux disease and associated laryngopharyngeal reflux causing laryngitis and chronic cough
- Barrett's esophagus
- Eosinophilic esophagitis
- Stress gastritis and ulcer prevention in critical care
- Gastrinomas
- Zollinger–Ellison syndrome (often 2–3× the regular dose is required)

Specialty professional organizations recommend that people take the lowest effective PPI dose to achieve the desired therapeutic result when used to treat gastroesophageal reflux disease long-term. In the United States, the Food and Drug Administration (FDA) has advised that over-the-counter PPIs, such as Prilosec OTC, should be used no more than three 14-day treatment courses over one year.

Despite their extensive use, the quality of the evidence supporting their use in some of these conditions is variable. The effectiveness of PPIs has not been demonstrated for every case. For example, although they reduce the incidence of esophageal adenocarcinoma in Barrett's oesophagus, they do not change the length affected. In addition, research in the UK has suggested that PPIs are not effective at treating persistent throat symptoms.

=== Indications for stopping PPIs ===
PPIs are often used longer than necessary. In about half of people who are hospitalized or seen at a primary care clinic there is no documented reason for their long-term use of PPIs. Some researchers believe that, given the little evidence of long-term effectiveness, the cost of the medication and the potential for harm means that clinicians should consider stopping PPIs in many people.

== Adverse effects ==
In general, proton pump inhibitors are well tolerated, and the incidence of short-term adverse effects is relatively low. The range and occurrence of adverse effects are similar for all of the PPIs, though they have been reported more frequently with omeprazole. This may be due to its longer availability and, hence, clinical experience.

Common adverse effects include headache, nausea, diarrhea, abdominal pain, fatigue, and dizziness. Infrequent adverse effects include rash, itch, flatulence, constipation, anxiety, and depression. Also infrequently, PPI use may be associated with occurrence of myopathies, including the serious reaction rhabdomyolysis.

Long-term use of PPIs requires assessment of the balance of the benefits and risks of the therapy. As of March 2017, various adverse outcomes have been associated with long-term PPI use in several primary reports, but reviews assess the overall quality of evidence in these studies as "low" or "very low". They describe inadequate evidence to establish causal relationships between PPI therapy and many of the proposed associations, due to study design and small estimates of effect size.

As of March 2017, benefits outweighed risks when PPIs are used appropriately, but when used inappropriately, modest risks become important. They recommend that PPIs should be used at the lowest effective dose in people with a proven indication, but discourage dose escalation and continued chronic therapy in people unresponsive to initial empiric therapy.

With regard to iron and vitamin B_{12}, the data is weak and several confounding factors have been identified. Low levels of magnesium can be found in people on PPI therapy and these can be reversed when they are switched to H_{2}-receptor antagonist medications.

=== Bone ===
High dose or long-term use of PPIs carries an increased risk of bone fractures which was not found with short-term, low dose use; the FDA included a warning regarding this on PPI drug labels in 2010.

In infants, acid suppression therapy is frequently prescribed to treat symptomatic gastroesophageal reflux in otherwise healthy infants (i.e., infants without gastroesophageal reflux disease). A study from 2019 showed that PPI use alone and together with histamine H2-receptor antagonists was associated with an increased bone fracture hazard, which was amplified by days of use and earlier initiation of therapy. The reason is not clear; increased bone breakdown by osteoclasts has been suggested.

A recent 2024 study published in the Journal of Clinical Endocrinology & Metabolism found that chronic use of PPIs in men is linked to lower trabecular bone quality. Specifically, PPI use was associated with reduced lumbar spine trabecular bone score (TBS), as well as lower bone mineral density (BMD) T-scores in the lumbar spine, total hip, and femoral neck.

=== Gastrointestinal ===
Some studies have shown a correlation between use of PPIs and Clostridioides difficile infection. While the data are contradictory and controversial, the FDA had sufficient concern to include a warning about this adverse effect on the label of PPI medications. Concerns have also been raised about spontaneous bacterial peritonitis (SBP) in older people taking PPIs and in people with irritable bowel syndrome taking PPIs; both types of infections arise in these populations due to underlying conditions and it is not clear if this is a class effect of PPIs. PPIs may predispose an individual to developing small intestinal bacterial overgrowth or fungal overgrowth.

In cirrhotic patients, large volume of ascites and reduced esophageal motility by varices can provoke GERD. Acidic irritation, in return, may induce the rupture of varices. Therefore, PPIs are often routinely prescribed for cirrhotic patients to treat GERD and prevent variceal bleeding. However, it has been recently shown that long term use of PPIs in patients with cirrhosis increases the risk of SBP and is associated with the development of clinical decompensation and liver-related death during long-term follow-up.

There is evidence that PPI use alters the composition of the bacterial populations inhabiting the gut, the gut microbiota. Although the mechanisms by which PPIs cause these changes are yet to be determined, they may have a role in the increased risk of bacterial infections with PPI use. These infections can include Helicobacter pylori due to this species not favouring an acid environment, leading to an increased risk of ulcers and gastric cancer risk in genetically susceptible patients.

PPI use in people who have received attempted H. pylori eradication may also be associated with an increased risk of gastric cancer. The validity and robustness of this finding, with the lack of causality, have led to this association being questioned. It is recommended that long-term PPIs should be used judiciously after considering individual's risk–benefit profile, particularly among those with history of H. pylori infection, and that further, well-designed, prospective studies are needed.

Long-term use of PPIs is associated with the development of benign polyps from fundic glands (which is distinct from fundic gland polyposis); these polyps do not cause cancer and resolve when PPIs are discontinued. There is concern that use of PPIs may mask gastric cancers or other serious gastric problems.

PPI use has also been associated with the development of microscopic colitis.

=== Cardiovascular ===
Associations of PPI use and cardiovascular events have also been widely studied but clear conclusions have not been made as these relative risks are confounded by other factors. PPIs are commonly used in people with cardiovascular disease for gastric protection when aspirin is given for its antiplatelet actions. An interaction between PPIs and the metabolism of the platelet inhibitor clopidogrel is known and this drug is also often used in people with cardiac disease. There are associations with an increased risk of stroke, but this appears to be more likely to occur in people who already have an elevated risk.

One suggested mechanism for cardiovascular effects is because PPIs bind and inhibit dimethylargininase, the enzyme that degrades asymmetric dimethylarginine (ADMA), resulting in higher ADMA levels and a decrease in bioavailable nitric oxide.

=== Cancer ===
A 2022 umbrella review of 21 meta-analyses shows an association between proton-pump inhibitor use and an increased risk of gastric cancer, pancreatic cancer, colorectal cancer, and liver cancer.

=== Other ===
Associations have been shown between PPI use and an increased risk of pneumonia, particularly in the 30 days after starting therapy, where it was found to be 50% higher in community use. Other very weak associations of PPI use have been found, such as with chronic kidney disease, dementia and Hepatocellular carcinoma (HCC).

As of 2016, results were derived from observational studies, it remained uncertain whether such associations were causal relationships.

== Mechanism of action ==
The activation of PPIs

Proton pump inhibitors act by irreversibly blocking the enzyme H^{+}/K^{+} ATPase (hydrogen/potassium adenosine triphosphatase), a proton pump of the gastric parietal cells.

The proton pump secretes H^{+} ions from the cytoplasm of the parietal cell over the cell membrane, where the pump is located, into the gastric lumen which creates gastric acid. PPIs, when taken orally, are absorbed in the proximal small intestine to the bloodstream. PPIs are prodrugs and weak bases that are activated in very acidic environment. They avoid early activation when first passing the stomach's acidic environment due to protective coating or capsule packaging of the medication. From the bloodstream, PPIs enter the parietal cells, and in their canaliculi (folds) they are activated in the very acidic environment. When activated, PPIs bind covalently to cysteine residues on the H^{+}/K^{+} ATPase on the luminal side of the parietal cell membrane and thus inhibit acid secretion. Since the binding is covalent, the duration of their effect is longer than expected from their levels in the blood.

Targeting the terminal step in acid production, as well as the irreversible nature of the inhibition, results in a class of medications that are significantly more effective than H_{2} antagonists and reduce gastric acid secretion by up to 99%.

In H. pylori eradication, PPIs help by increasing the stomach pH, causing the bacterium to shift out of its coccoid form which is resistant to both acids and antibiotics. PPIs also show some weaker additional effects in eradication.

== Pharmacokinetics ==
The rate of omeprazole absorption is decreased by concomitant food intake. In addition, the absorption of lansoprazole and esomeprazole is decreased and delayed by food. It has been reported, however, that these pharmacokinetic effects have no significant impact on efficacy.

In healthy humans, the half-life of PPIs is about 1 hour (9 hours for tenatoprazole), but the duration of acid inhibition is 48 hours because of irreversible binding to the H,K-ATPase. All the PPIs except tenatoprazole are rapidly metabolized in the liver by CYP enzymes (mostly by CYP2C19 and 3A4). Dissociation of the inhibitory complex is probably due to the effect of the endogenous antioxidant glutathione which leads to the release of omeprazole sulfide and reactivation of the enzyme.

== History ==
PPIs were developed in the 1980s, with omeprazole being launched in 1988. Most of these medications are benzimidazole derivatives, related to omeprazole, but imidazopyridine derivatives such as tenatoprazole have also been developed. Potassium-competitive inhibitors such as revaprazan reversibly block the potassium-binding site of the proton pump, acting more quickly, but are not available in most countries.

== Society and culture ==
=== Economics ===
In British Columbia, Canada the cost of the PPIs varies significantly from CA$0.13 to CA$2.38 per dose while all agents in the class appear more or less equally effective.

=== Regulatory approval ===
A comparative table of FDA-approved indications for PPIs is shown below.

Comparative indications
Indication	Omeprazole	Esomeprazole	Lansoprazole	Dexlansoprazole	Pantoprazole	Rabeprazole
Gastroesophageal reflux disease
Erosive esophagitis-healing	Yes	Yes	Yes	Yes	Yes	Yes
Erosive esophagitis-maintenance	Yes	Yes	Yes	Yes	Yes	Yes
Nonerosive reflux disease	Yes	Yes	Yes	Yes	No	Yes
Peptic ulcer disease
Duodenal ulcer-healing	Yes	No	Yes	No	No	Yes
Duodenal ulcer-maintenance	No	No	Yes	No	No	No
Gastric ulcer-healing	Yes	No	Yes	No	No	No
NSAID induced ulcer-healing	No	No	Yes	No	No	No
NSAID induced ulcer-prophylaxis	No	Yes	Yes	No	No	No
Zollinger–Ellison syndrome	Yes	Yes	Yes	No	Yes	Yes
Treatment of Helicobacter pylori
Dual therapy	Yes	No	Yes	No	No	No
Triple therapy	Yes	Yes	Yes	No	No	Yes
