= Hydrogen potassium ATPase =

Class of transport proteins

ATPase, H+/K+ exchanging, alpha polypeptide

Identifiers
- Symbol: ATP4A
- NCBI gene: 495
- HGNC: 819
- OMIM: 137216
- RefSeq: NM_000704
- UniProt: P20648

Other data
- EC number: 7.2.2.19
- Locus: Chr. 19 q13.1
Search for
- Structures: Swiss-model
- Domains: InterPro

ATPase, H+/K+ exchanging, beta polypeptide

Identifiers
- Symbol: ATP4B
- NCBI gene: 496
- HGNC: 820
- OMIM: 137217
- RefSeq: NM_000705
- UniProt: P51164

Other data
- EC number: 7.2.2.19
- Locus: Chr. 13 q34
Search for
- Structures: Swiss-model
- Domains: InterPro

Gastric hydrogen potassium ATPase, also known as H^{+}/K^{+} ATPase, is an enzyme which functions to acidify the stomach. It is a member of the P-type ATPases, also known as E_{1}-E_{2} ATPases due to their two states.

== Genes ==
The two subunits of H^{+}/K^{+} ATPase are encoded by separate genes. ATP4A encodes the α subunit, and ATP4B encodes the β subunit.

== Tissue distribution ==
The H^{+}/K^{+} ATPase is found in parietal cells, which are highly specialized epithelial cells located in the inner cell lining of the stomach called the gastric mucosa. Parietal cells possess an extensive secretory membrane system and the H^{+}/K^{+} ATPase is the major protein constituent of these membranes. A small amount of H^{+}/K^{+} ATPase is also found in the renal medulla.

== Structure ==
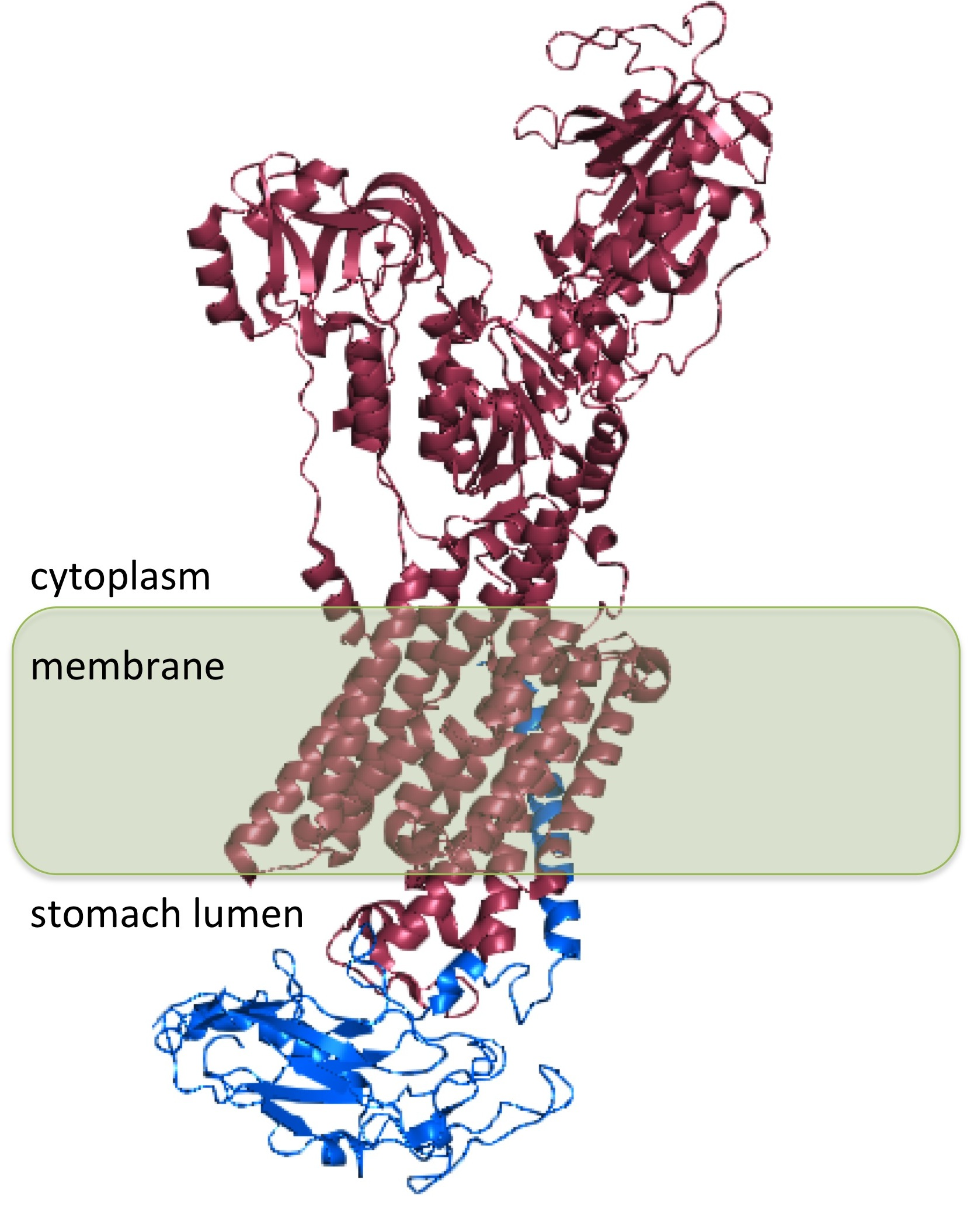
Structure of the hydrogen potassium ATPase. The α subunit is shown in pink; the β subunit is shown in blue.

The H^{+}/K^{+} ATPase is a heterodimeric protein composed of an α subunit and a β subunit.

The α subunit is approximately 1,000 amino acids long. It contains the catalytic sites of the enzyme and forms the ion transport pathway through the cell membrane. Hydronium ions bind to two active sites in the α subunit. The α subunit also has a phosphorylation site at Asp^{385}.

The β subunit is approximately 300 amino acids long and consists of a 36-amino acid N-terminal cytoplasmic domain, a single transmembrane domain, and a highly glycosylated extracellular domain. It stabilizes the α subunit and is required for enzyme function. The β subunit prevents the pump from running in reverse and appears to contain signals that direct the heterodimer to membrane destinations within the cell, although some of these signals are subordinate to signals in the α subunit.

The structure of H^{+}/K^{+} ATPase has been determined for humans, dogs, hogs, rats, and rabbits and is 98% homologous across these species.

== Function ==
The gastric hydrogen potassium ATPase or H^{+}/K^{+} ATPase is the proton pump of the stomach. It exchanges potassium from the intestinal lumen with cytoplasmic hydronium and is the enzyme primarily responsible for the acidification of the stomach contents and the activation of the digestive enzyme pepsin (see gastric acid).

== Enzyme mechanism and activity ==
H^{+}/K^{+} ATPase is a P_{2}-type ATPase, a member of the eukaryotic class of P-type ATPases. Like the Ca^{2+} and the Na^{+}/K^{+} ATPases, the H^{+}/K^{+} ATPase functions as an α, β protomer. Unlike other eukaryotic ATPases, the H^{+}/K^{+} ATPase is electroneutral, transporting one proton into the stomach lumen per potassium ion retrieved from the gastric lumen. As an ion pump the H^{+}/K^{+} ATPase is able to transport ions against a concentration gradient using energy derived from the hydrolysis of ATP. Like all P-type ATPases, a phosphate group is transferred from adenosine triphosphate (ATP) to the H^{+}/K^{+} ATPase during the transport cycle. This phosphate transfer powers a conformational change in the enzyme that helps drive ion transport.

The hydrogen potassium ATPase is activated indirectly by gastrin that causes ECL cells to release histamine. The histamine binds to H2 receptors on the parietal cell, activating a cAMP-dependent pathway which causes the enzyme to move from the cytoplasmic tubular membranes to deeply folded canaliculi of the stimulated parietal cell. Once localized, the enzyme alternates between two conformations, E1 and E2, to transport ions across the membrane.

Mechanism of the H^{+}/K^{+} ATPase demonstrating how E1-E2 conformational change corresponds to ion release. See Shin et al.

The E1 conformation binds a phosphate from ATP and hydronium ion on the cytoplasmic side. The enzyme then changes to the E2 conformation, allowing hydronium to be released in the lumen. The E2 conformation binds potassium, and reverts to the E1 conformation to release phosphate and K^{+} into the cytoplasm where another ATP can be hydrolyzed to repeat the cycle. The β subunit prevents the E2-P conformation from reverting to the E1-P conformation, making proton pumping unidirectional. The number of ions transported per ATP varies from 2H^{+}/2K^{+} to 1H^{+}/1K^{+}depending on the pH of the stomach.

== Inhibition ==
Inhibiting the hydrogen potassium pump to decrease stomach acidity has been the most common method of treating diseases including gastroesophageal reflux disease (GERD/GORD) and peptic ulcer disease (PUD). Reducing acidity alleviates disease symptoms but does not treat the actual cause of GERD (abnormal relaxation of the esophageal sphincter) or PUD (Helicobacter pylori and NSAIDs).

Three drug classes have been used to inhibit H^{+}/K^{+}-ATPases. H_{2}-receptor antagonists, like cimetidine (Tagamet), inhibit the signaling pathway that leads to activation of the ATPase. This type of inhibitor is effective in treating ulcers but does not prevent them from forming, and patients develop tolerance to them after about one week, leading to a 50% reduction in efficacy. Proton pump inhibitors (PPIs) were later developed, starting with Timoprazole in 1975. PPIs are acid-activated prodrugs that inhibit the hydrogen-potassium ATPase by binding covalently to active pumps. Current PPIs like omeprazole have a short half-life of approximately 90 minutes. Acid pump antagonists (APAs) or potassium-competitive acid blockers (PCABs) are a third type of inhibitor that blocks acid secretion by binding to the K^{+} active site. APAs provide faster inhibition than PPIs since they do not require acid activation. Revaprazan was the first APA used clinically in east Asia, and other APAs are being developed since they appear to provide better acid control in clinical trials.

== Clinical significance ==
Inactivation of the proton pump can also lead to health problems. A study in mice by Krieg et al. found that a mutation of the pump's α-subunit led to achlorhydria, resulting in problems with iron absorption, leading to iron deficiency and anemia. The use of PPIs has not been correlated with an elevated risk of anemia, so the H^{+}/K^{+}-ATPase is thought to aid iron absorption but is not necessarily required.

Current association of dementia and PPIs have been documented in Germany and in research articles denoting how Benzimidazole derivatives, Astemizole (AST) and Lansoprazole (LNS) interact with anomalous aggregates of tau protein (neurofibrillary tangles). Current theories include the non-selective blockade of sodium-potassium pumps in the brain causing osmotic imbalances or swelling in the cells. [auth opinion] Interaction of PPIs with other drug affecting the sodium-potassium pump, e.g., digoxin, warfarin etc., has been well documented. Memory has been associated with astrocytes and the alpha3 subunit of adenosine receptor found in hydrogen/Sodium-potassium pumps may be a focal point in dementia. Chronic use of PPIs may cause down regulation of alpha3 subunit increasing damage to astrocytes. Osteopetrosis via TCIRG1 gene has a strong association with pre-senile dementia.

== See also ==
- Discovery and development of proton pump inhibitors
- Solvated electron
