= Drug nomenclature =

Systematic naming of drugs

Drug nomenclature is the systematic naming of drugs, especially pharmaceutical drugs. In general, drugs have 3 types of names: chemical names, for which IUPAC nomenclature is the most accepted naming system; nonproprietary (generic) names, for which the international nonproprietary name (INN) system is the most accepted naming system; and trade names, which are brand names used for marketing and selling drugs. Under the INN system, generic names for drugs contain affixes or stems that can be used to identify what class a drug belongs to, while ensuring related names are distinguishable. A marketed drug might also have a company code or compound code.

== Legal regulation ==
Drug names are often subject to legal regulation, including approval for new drugs (to avoid confusion with existing drugs) and on packaging to establish clear rules about adulterants and fraudulent or misleading labeling. A national formulary is often designated to define drug names (and purity standards) for regulatory purposes. The legally approved names in various countries include:

- Australian Approved Name
- Brazilian Nonproprietary Name
- British Approved Name
- Dénomination Commune Française (France)
- Denominazione Comune Italiana (Italy, generic name)
- Japanese Accepted Name
- United States Adopted Name

The World Health Organization administers the international nonproprietary name list.

A company or person developing a drug can apply for a generic (nonproprietary) name through their national formulary or directly to the WHO INN Programme. In order to minimize confusion, many of the national naming bodies have policies of maintaining harmony between national nonproprietary names and INNs. The European Union has mandated this harmonization for all member states. In the United States, the developer applies to United States Adopted Name (USAN) Council, and a USAN negotiator applies to the INN on the developer's behalf.

== Chemical names ==
The chemical names are the scientific names, based on the molecular structure of the drug. There are various systems of chemical nomenclature and thus various chemical names for any one substance. The most important is the IUPAC name. Chemical names are typically very long and too complex to be commonly used in referring to a drug in speech or in prose documents. For example, "1-(isopropylamino)-3-(1-naphthyloxy) propan-2-ol" is a chemical name for propranolol. Sometimes, a company that is developing a drug might give the drug a company code, which is used to identify the drug while it is in development. For example, CDP870 was UCB's company code for certolizumab pegol; UCB later chose "Cimzia" as its trade name. Many of these codes, although not all, have prefixes that correspond to the company name.

== Nonproprietary (generic) names ==
Generic names are generally more concise than chemical names and more standard than trade names, and are thus widely used to describe pharmaceutical compounds. They appear on all drug labels, advertising, and other information about the substance. They are used in the medical setting, scientific discussions, and descriptions of clinical trials. In addition, a generic name can also indicate what class a drug belongs to. This is because each drug class has a unique stem or affix that all drugs within the class include in their generic names. For example, "aciclovir" can be identified as an antiviral drug because its name contains the "-vir" suffix.

=== History ===
The earliest roots of standardization of generic names for drugs began with city pharmacopoeias, such as the London, Edinburgh, Dublin, Hamburg, and Berlin Pharmacopoeias. The fundamental advances in chemistry during the 19th century made that era the first time in which what is now called chemical nomenclature, a huge profusion of names based on atoms, functional groups, and molecules, was necessary or conceivable. In the second half of the 19th century and the early 20th, city pharmacopoeias were unified into national pharmacopoeias (such as the British Pharmacopoeia, United States Pharmacopeia, Pharmacopoeia Germanica (PhG or PG), Italian Pharmacopeia, and Japanese Pharmacopoeia) and national formularies (such as the British National Formulary, the Australian Pharmaceutical Formulary, and the National Formulary of India). International pharmacopeias, such as the European Pharmacopoeia and the International Pharmacopoeia of the World Health Organization (WHO), have been the next level.

In 1953 the WHO created the International Nonproprietary Name (INN) system, which issues INNs in various languages, including Latin, English, French, Spanish, Russian, Chinese, and Arabic. Several countries also have national-level systems for creating generic drug names, including the British Approved Name (BAN) system, the Australian Approved Name (AAN) system, the United States Adopted Name (USAN) system (which is mostly the same as the United States Pharmacopeia (USP) system), and the Japanese Accepted Name (JAN) system. At least several of these national-level Approved Name/Adopted Name/Accepted Name systems were not created until the 1960s, after the INN system already existed. In the 21st century, increasing globalization is encouraging maximal rationalization for new generic names for drugs, and there is an increasing expectation that new USANs, BANs, and JANs will not differ from new INNs without special justification.

During the first half of the 20th century, generic names for drugs were often coined by contracting the chemical names into fewer syllables. Such contraction was partially, informally, locally standardized, but it was not universally consistent. In the second half of the 20th century, the nomenclatural systems moved away from such contraction toward the present system of stems and affixes that show chemical relationships.

Biopharmaceuticals have posed a challenge in nonproprietary naming because unlike smaller molecules made with total synthesis or semisynthesis, there is less assurance of complete fungibility between products from different manufacturers. Just as wine may vary by strain of yeast and year of grape harvest, so each product can be subtly different because living organisms are an integral part of production. The WHO MedNet community continually works to augment its system for biopharmaceuticals to ensure continued fulfillment of the goals served by having nonproprietary names. In recent years the development of the Biological Qualifier system has been an example.

The prefixes and interfixes have no pharmacological significance and are used to separate the drug from others in the same class. Suffixes or stems may be found in the middle or more often the end of the drug name, and normally suggest the action of the drug. Generic names often have suffixes that define what class the drug is.

=== List of stems and affixes ===
More comprehensive lists can be found in Appendix VII of the USP Dictionary or in the WHO INN stembook.

Common examples include:

Stem/ Affix	Drug class	Etymology	Example
-vir	Antivirals	Virus	Aciclovir; Oseltamivir
-cillin	Penicillin-derived antibiotics	Penicillin	Amoxicillin; Piperacillin; Oxacillin
cef- (Alternatively,ceph-)	Cephem-type antibiotics	Cephalosporin	Cefazolin (or Cefazoline or Cephazolin); Cefalexin (or Cephalexin)
-mab	Monoclonal antibodies (mABs)	Monoclonal antibody Further information: Nomenclature of monoclonal antibodies	Also see stems such as: -ximab, -zumab, -umab, etc.: Trastuzumab; Ipilimumab
-ximab	Chimeric monoclonal antibodies	-xi- (Chimeric) + -mab Further information: Nomenclature of monoclonal antibodies	Infliximab; Rituximab
-zumab	humanized antibody	-zu- (Humanized) + -mab Further information: Nomenclature of monoclonal antibodies	Natalizumab; Bevacizumab
-vastatin: -statin	HMG-CoA reductase inhibitor (or statins)	Vascular + -statin	Atorvastatin; Simvastatin
-prazole	Proton-pump inhibitors (PPIs)	Timoprazole	Omeprazole; Pantoprazole
-lukast	Leukotriene receptor antagonists (LTRAs)	Leukotriene + Antagonist	Zafirlukast; Montelukast
-grel-	Platelet aggregation inhibitors (or antiplatelets)		Clopidogrel; Ticagrelor
-olol: -lol	Beta-blockers (a type of antihypertensive)	Propranolol	Propranolol; Metoprolol; Atenolol; Labetalol
-oxetine	Fluoxetine-related antidepressants	Fluoxetine	Fluoxetine; Duloxetine; Reboxetine
-sartan	Angiotensin II receptor blockers (ARBs, or sartans) (a type of antihypertensive)	Sartan, which itself is derived from Selective + Angiotensin + Receptor + Antagonist	Losartan; Valsartan
-pril	Angiotensin converting enzyme inhibitor (ACEIs) (a type of antihypertensive)	Captopril	Captopril; Lisinopril
-oxacin	Quinolone-derived antibiotics	Cinoxacin	Levofloxacin; Moxifloxacin
-barb-	Barbiturates	Barbiturate	Phenobarbital; Secobarbital
-xaban	Direct Xa inhibitor (or xabans)	Factor Xa + ban	Apixaban; Rivaroxaban
-afil	cGMP-specific phosphodiesterase type 5 (PDE5) inhibitors with vasodilator action (a type of antihypertensive and erectile dysfunction drug)	Sildenafil	Sildenafil; Tadalafil
-prost-	Prostaglandin analogues	Prostaglandin	Latanoprost; Unoprostone
-ine	Alkaloids and organic bases	Further information: -ine	Atropine; Morphine; Quinine
-tide	Peptides, including glycopeptides	Peptide	Nesiritide; Octreotide
-vec	Gene therapy vectors	Vector	Alipogene tiparvovec
-caine	Local anaesthetics (LAs)	Cocaine	Benzocaine; Lidocaine (or Lignocaine); Cocaine
-dipine	Dihydropyridine (DHP) Calcium channel blockers (CCBs) (a type of antihypertensive)	Nifedipine, of which is derived from Dihydropyridine	Nifedipine; Amlodipine; Felodipine
-tidine	H2 receptor antagonists (H2RAs)	Cimetidine, of which is derived from Guanidine	Cimetidine; Ranitidine; Famotidine
-setron	5-HT_{3} antagonists (or setrons)	Serotonin (5-HT) receptor	Ondansetron; Granisetron; Palonosetron
-mycin	Streptomyces antibiotics	Streptomycin	Vancomycin; Streptomycin; Neomycin
-azepam: -azolam; -azam	Diazepam-derived benzodiazepines (benzos)	-azepam: Diazepam, of which is derived from Benzodiazepines + Amide -azolam: Azole + -azepam -azam: Contraction of -azepam or -azolam	Diazepam; Midazolam; Lorazepam; Clobazam

=== Example breakdown of a drug name ===
If the name of the drug solanezumab were to be broken down, it would be divided into two parts like this: solane-zumab. -Zumab is the suffix for humanized monoclonal antibody. Monoclonal antibodies by definition contain only a single antibody clone and have binding specificity for one particular epitope. In the case of solanezumab, the antibody is designed to bond to the amyloid-β peptides which make up protein plaques on the neurons of people with Alzheimer's disease.

See also Time release technology > List of abbreviations for formulation suffixes.

=== Combination drug products ===
For combination drug products—those with two or more drugs combined into a single dosage form—single nonproprietary names beginning with "co-" exist in both British Approved Name (BAN) form and in a formerly maintained USP name called the pharmacy equivalent name (PEN). Otherwise the two names are simply both given, joined by hyphens or slashes. For example, suspensions combining trimethoprim and sulfamethoxazole are called either trimethoprim/sulfamethoxazole or co-trimoxazole. Similarly, co-codamol is codeine-paracetamol (acetaminophen), and co-triamterzide is triamterene-hydrochlorothiazide. The USP ceased maintaining PENs, but the similar "co"-prefixed BANs are still current.

=== Pronunciation ===
Most commonly, a nonproprietary drug name has one widely agreed pronunciation in each language. For example, doxorubicin is consistently /ˌdɒksoʊˈruːbɪsɪn/ in English. Trade names almost always have one accepted pronunciation, because the sponsoring company who coined the name has an intended pronunciation for it.

However, it is also common for a nonproprietary drug name to have two pronunciation variants, or sometimes three. For example, for paracetamol, both /ˌpærəˈsiːtəmɒl/ and /ˌpærəˈsɛtəmɒl/ are common, and one medical dictionary gives /pæˌræsɪˈtæmɒl/.

Some of the variation comes from the fact that some stems and affixes have pronunciation variants. For example, the aforementioned third (and least common) pronunciation for paracetamol reflects the treatment of the acet affix as /ˈæsɪt/ rather than /əˈsiːt/ (both are accepted for acetyl).

The World Health Organization does not give suggested pronunciations for its INNs, but familiarity with the typical sounds and spellings of the stems and affixes often points to the widely accepted pronunciation of any given INN. For example, abciximab is predictably /æbˈsɪksɪmæb/, because for INNs ending in -ciximab, the /ˈsɪksɪmæb/ sound is familiar. The United States Pharmacopeia gives suggested pronunciations for most USANs in its USP Dictionary, which is published in annual editions. Medical dictionaries give pronunciations of many drugs that are both commonly used and have been commercially available for a decade or more, although many newer drugs or less common drugs are not entered. Pharmacists also have access to pronunciations from various clinical decision support systems such as Lexicomp.

== Drug brands ==
For drugs that make it all the way through development, testing, and regulatory acceptance, the pharmaceutical company then gives the drug a trade name, which is a standard term in the pharmaceutical industry for a brand name or trademark name. For example, Lipitor is Pfizer's trade name for atorvastatin, a cholesterol-lowering medication. Many drugs have multiple trade names, reflecting marketing in different countries, manufacture by different companies, or both. Thus the trade names for atorvastatin include not only Lipitor (in the U.S.) but also Atocor (in India).

== Publication policies for nonproprietary and proprietary names ==
In the scientific literature, there is a set of strong conventions for drug nomenclature regarding the letter case and placement of nonproprietary and proprietary names, as follows:

- Nonproprietary names begin in lowercase; trade names begin with a capital.
- Unbiased mentions of a drug place the nonproprietary name first and follow it with the trade name in parentheses, if relevant (for example, "doxorubicin (Adriamycin)").
  - This pattern is important for the scientific literature, where conflict of interest is disclosed or avoided. The authors reporting on a study are not endorsing any particular brand of drug. They will often state which brand was used, for methodologic validity (fully disclosing all details that might possibly affect reproducibility), but they do so in a way that makes clear the absence of endorsement.

For example, the 2015 American Society of Hematology (ASH) publication policies say, "Non-proprietary (generic/scientific) names should be used and should be lowercase." ... "[T]he first letter of the name of a proprietary drug should be capitalized." ... "If necessary, you may include a proprietary name in parentheses directly following the generic name after its first mention."

Valid exceptions to the general pattern occur when a nonproprietary name starts a sentence (and thus takes a capital), when a proprietary name has intercapping (for example, GoLYTELY, MiraLAX), or when tall-man letters are used within nonproprietary names to prevent confusion of similar names (for example, predniSONE versus predniSOLONE).

=== Examples ===
Sample of different drug names
Chemical Name	Generic Name	Example Brand Name
N-acetyl-p-aminophenol	paracetamol, acetaminophen (US, JP)	Tylenol
(RS)-2-(4-(2-methylpropyl)phenyl)propanoic acid	ibuprofen	Motrin
(2R,3S,4R,5R,8R,10R,11R,12S,13S,14R)-13-[(2,6-dideoxy-3-C-methyl-3-O-methyl-α-L-ribo-hexopyranosyl)oxy]-2-ethyl-3,4,10-trihydroxy-3,5,6,8,10,12,14-heptamethyl-11-[[3,4,6-trideoxy-3-(dimethylamino)-β-D-xylo-hexopyranosyl]oxy]-1-oxa-6-azacyclopentadecan-15-one	azithromycin	Zithromax
ethyl 4-(8-chloro-5,6-dihydro-11H-benzo[5,6]cyclohepta[1,2-b]pyridin-11-ylidene) -1-piperidinecarboxylate	loratadine	Claritin
2-acetoxybenzoic acid	acetylsalicylic acid	Aspirin
3-(2-methoxyphenoxy)propane-1,2-diol	guaifenesin	Mucinex
2-(diphenylmethoxy)-N,N-dimethylethylamine hydrochloride	diphenhydramine	Benadryl
3-[(4,5-dihydro-1H-imidazol-2-yl)methyl]-6-(1,1-dimethylethyl)-2,4-dimethyl-phenol hydrochloride	oxymetazoline	Visine
(3R,5R)-7-[2-(4-fluorophenyl)-3-phenyl-4-(phenylcarbamoyl)-5-propan-2-ylpyrrol-1-yl]-3,5-dihydroxyheptanoic acid	atorvastatin calcium	Lipitor
4,5α-epoxy-3-methoxy-17-methylmorphinan-6-one tartrate (1:1) hydrate (2:5)	hydrocodone with acetaminophen	Vicodin

== See also ==
- Drug class
- Drug development
- Generic brand
- Pharmaceutical code
- Regulation of therapeutic goods
- List of pharmaceutical compound number prefixes
