= C17H15NO3 =

The molecular formula C_{17}H_{15}NO_{3} (molar mass: 281.31 g/mol, exact mass: 281.1052 u) may refer to:

- Acetoxyacetylaminofluorene
- Indoprofen
- Noroliveroline
