= C14H12O3S =

The molecular formula C_{14}H_{12}O_{3}S (molar mass: 260.31 g/mol, exact mass: 260.0507 u) may refer to:

- Suprofen
- Tiaprofenic acid
