= Profen (drug class) =

Class of nonsteroidal anti-inflammatory drugs

Left: general chemical structure of profens (Ar = aryl group). Right: chemical structure of ibuprofen

The profens are a class of nonsteroidal anti-inflammatory drugs. Profens are also known as 2-arylpropionic acids to reflect their chemical structure. The most common example of a profen is ibuprofen, which has been sold under the brand names Advil, Nurofen, and Profen among others.

== Examples ==
Common examples of profens include:

- Alminoprofen
- Benoxaprofen
- Carprofen
- Dexibuprofen
- Dexketoprofen
- Fenoprofen
- Flunoxaprofen
- Flurbiprofen
- Ibuprofen
- Indoprofen
- Ketoprofen
- Loxoprofen
- Miroprofen
- Naproxen
- Pelubiprofen
- Pirprofen
- Pranoprofen
- Suprofen
- Tarenflurbil
- Tiaprofenic acid
- Vedaprofen
- Zaltoprofen
