= C17H19N3O3S =

The molecular formula C_{17}H_{19}N_{3}O_{3}S (molar mass: 345.417 g/mol, exact mass: 345.1147 u) may refer to:

- Esomeprazole
- Omeprazole
