= Naproxen/diphenhydramine =

Drug combination used to relieve pain

Combination of
- Naproxen: NSAID
- Diphenhydramine: Antihistamine

Clinical data
- Trade names: Aleve PM, others
- AHFS/Drugs.com: Aleve-PM
- License data: US DailyMed: Diphenhydramine hydrochloride and naproxen sodium
- Routes of administration: By mouth
- ATC code: R06AA52 (WHO) M01AE57 (WHO)

Legal status
- Legal status: CA: OTC; US: OTC

Naproxen/diphenhydramine, sold under the brand name Aleve PM among others, is a formulation of naproxen with diphenhydramine marketed by Bayer Healthcare. It is available over-the-counter. The intended use of the drug is relieve pain specifically when going to sleep.

== Adverse effects ==
Women in the third trimester of pregnancy should avoid this drug because there is a risk that naproxen, like other NSAIDs, may cause premature closure of the ductus arteriosus.

In October 2020, the US Food and Drug Administration (FDA) required the prescribing information to be updated for all nonsteroidal anti-inflammatory medications to describe the risk of kidney problems in unborn babies that result in low amniotic fluid. They recommend avoiding NSAIDs in pregnant women at 20 weeks or later in pregnancy.
