= C13H11N =

The molecular formula C_{13}H_{11}N (molar mass: 181.238 g/mol) may refer to:

- Benzophenone imine, an organic compound with the formula of (C_{6}H_{5})_{2}C=NH
- 2-Aminofluorene, a synthetic arylamine
