= C15H13NO2 =

The molecular formula C_{15}H_{13}NO_{2} (molar mass: 239.27 g/mol) may refer to:

- Diarylpropionitrile (DPN or 2,3-BHPPN)
- Hydroxyacetylaminofluorene
