= N-hydroxy-2-acetamidofluorene reductase =

Class of enzymes

Identifiers
- EC no.: 1.7.1.12
- CAS no.: 99890-08-1

Databases
- IntEnz: IntEnz view
- BRENDA: BRENDA entry
- ExPASy: NiceZyme view
- KEGG: KEGG entry
- MetaCyc: metabolic pathway
- PRIAM: profile
- PDB structures: RCSB PDB PDBe PDBsum
- Gene Ontology: AmiGO / QuickGO
Search
- PMC: articles
- PubMed: articles
- NCBI: proteins

N-hydroxy-2-acetamidofluorene reductase (EC 1.7.1.12) is an enzyme that catalyzes the chemical reaction

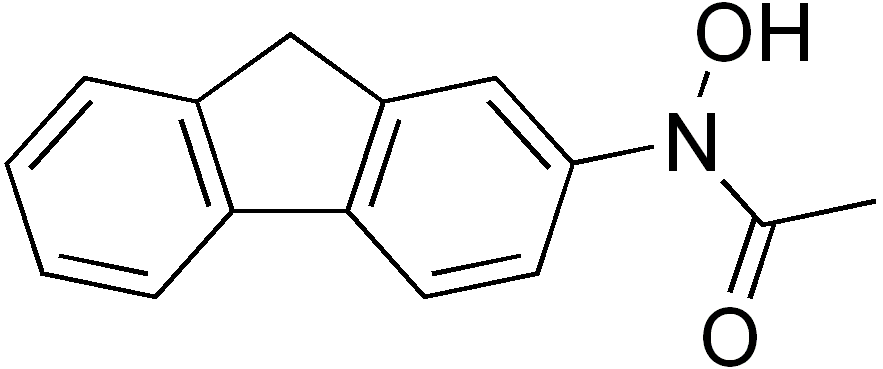
hydroxyacetylaminofluorene
+ NADH
H^{+}
H_{2}O
H^{+}
H_{2}O
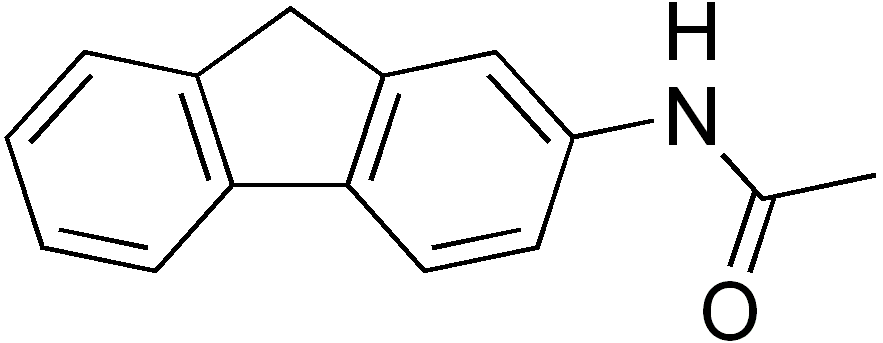
2-acetylaminofluorene
+ NAD^{+}

The three substrates of this enzyme are hydroxyacetylaminofluorene, reduced nicotinamide adenine dinucleotide (NADH), and a proton. Its products are 2-acetylaminofluorene, oxidised NAD^{+}, and water. The enzyme can use nicotinamide adenine dinucleotide phosphate as an alternative cofactor.

This enzyme belongs to the family of oxidoreductases, specifically those acting on other nitrogenous compounds as donors with NAD+ or NADP+ as acceptor. The systematic name of this enzyme class is 2-acetamidofluorene:NAD(P)+ oxidoreductase. Other names in common use include N-hydroxy-2-acetylaminofluorene reductase, and NAD(P)H:N-hydroxy-2-acetamidofluorene N-oxidoreductase.
