= Briner =

Briner is a surname. Notable people with the surname include:

- Andres Briner (1923 – 2014), Swiss music historian,
- George Briner (1862–1920), Australian politician
- Justin Briner, American voice actor and singer
- Karin Briner, Swiss biochemist
- Robert Briner (1935–1999), American television producer
- Yuliy Borisovich Briner stage name Yul Brynner (1920–1985), Russian American actor
