= Arthralgia =

Joint pain

Joint Pain
- Specialty: Rheumatology
- Causes: Varied
- Diagnostic method: Health care provider interview of patient and performing physical exam(s)
- Treatment: Based on underlying cause(s)

Arthralgia (from Greek arthro- 'joint' and -algos 'pain') literally means 'joint pain'. Specifically, arthralgia is a symptom of injury, infection, illness (in particular arthritis), or an allergic reaction to medication.

According to MeSH, the term arthralgia should only be used when the condition is non-inflammatory, and the term arthritis should be used when the condition is inflammatory.

== Causes ==
The causes of arthralgia are varied and range, from a joints perspective, from degenerative and destructive processes such as osteoarthritis and sports injuries to inflammation of tissues surrounding the joints, such as bursitis. These might be triggered by other things, such as infections or vaccinations.

Cause	Mono- or polyarticular	Speed of onset
Rheumatoid arthritis	Polyarticular	Weeks–months
Systemic lupus erythematosus	Polyarticular	Months
Viral arthritis	Polyarticular	
Ehlers-Danlos syndrome		
Reactive arthritis	Polyarticular	
Rheumatic fever	Polyarticular	
Lyme disease	Polyarticular	
Gonococcal arthritis	Polyarticular	
Drug-induced arthritis	Polyarticular	
Ligamentous laxity	Polyarticular	
Osteoarthritis	Monoarticular	
Gout attack	Monoarticular	Hours
Pseudogout	Monoarticular	
Behcet's disease	Monoarticular	
Physical trauma	Monoarticular	Immediate
Septic arthritis	Monoarticular	Hours
Hemarthrosis	Monoarticular	
5HT2-antagonists
Henoch-Schonlein purpura		

== Diagnosis ==
Diagnosis involves interviewing the patient and performing physical exams. When attempting to establish the cause of the arthralgia, the emphasis is on the interview. The patient is asked questions intended to narrow the number of potential causes. Given the varied nature of these possible causes, some questions may seem irrelevant. For example, the patient may be asked about dry mouth, light sensitivity, rashes or a history of seizures. Answering yes or no to any of these questions limits the number of possible causes and guides the physician toward the appropriate exams and lab tests.

== Treatment ==
Treatment depends on a specific underlying cause. The underlying cause will be treated first and foremost. The treatments may include joint replacement surgery for severely damaged joints, immunosuppressants for immune system dysfunction, antibiotics when an infection is the cause, and discontinuing medication when an allergic reaction is the cause. When treating the primary cause, pain management may still play a role in treatment.

== See also ==
- Antiarthritics
- Myalgia
