= Naproxen/esomeprazole =

Pain reliever medication

Combination of
- Naproxen: NSAID
- Esomeprazole: Proton pump inhibitor

Clinical data
- Trade names: Vimovo
- AHFS/Drugs.com: Professional Drug Facts
- Pregnancy category: AU: C
- Routes of administration: By mouth
- ATC code: M01AE52 (WHO)

Legal status
- Legal status: AU: S4 (Prescription only); US: ℞-only

Identifiers
- CAS Number: 1234369-58-4
- KEGG: D11576

Naproxen/esomeprazole, sold under the brand name Vimovo, is a pain reliever medication in the form of a tablet for oral consumption, containing naproxen, a nonsteroidal anti-inflammatory drug (NSAID), and a delayed release formulation of esomeprazole, a stomach acid–reducing proton-pump inhibitor (PPI). It is produced by AstraZeneca. Vimovo is US Food and Drug Administration approved for use against osteoarthritis, rheumatoid arthritis, and ankylosing spondylitis. It is intended to decrease the risk of gastric ulcers from treatment with NSAIDs.

It is available as a generic medication. In 2020, it was the 390th most commonly prescribed medication in the United States, with more than 300,000 prescriptions.

== Society and culture ==
=== Economics ===
Vimovo was acquired by the Ireland-based company, Horizon Pharma on November 19, 2013. AstraZeneca retained "ex-U.S. rights to Vimovo".

In a June 2017 article in The Atlantic, journalist Marshall Allen wrote that, the cost of Aleve and Nexium, the two common medications" that became the specialty drug Vimovo, was $40 a month. Horizon Pharma bills insurance companies $3,252 a month for Vimovo. According to The Atlantic, "since 2014, Horizon Pharma's net sales have been more than $455 million".
