= Antiarthritics =

Drug class

An antiarthritic is any drug used to relieve or prevent arthritic symptoms, such as joint pain or joint stiffness. Depending on the antiarthritic drug class, it is used for managing pain, reducing inflammation or acting as an immunosuppressant. These drugs are typically given orally, topically or through administration by injection. The choice of antiarthritic medication is often determined by the nature of arthritis, the severity of symptoms as well as other factors, such as the tolerability of side effects.

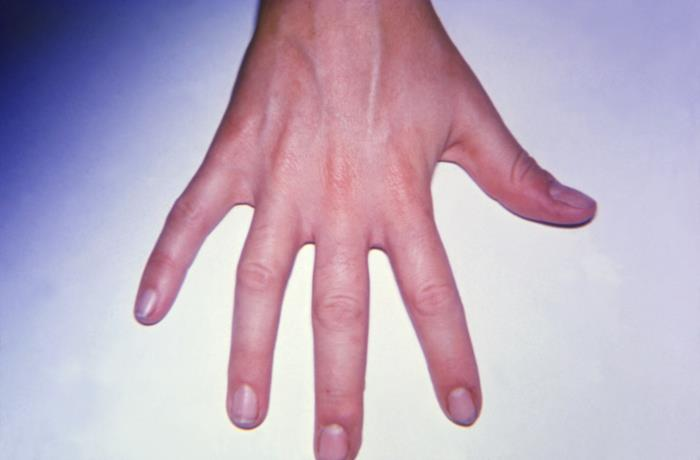
A dorsal view of the hand, revealed swelling of the finger joints, indicative of an underlying inflammatory process at the proximal interphalangeal joints

Common antiarthritic drug classes include the following: disease-modifying antirheumatic drugs, biologic response modifiers, analgesics, non-steroidal anti-inflammatory drugs, and corticosteroids.

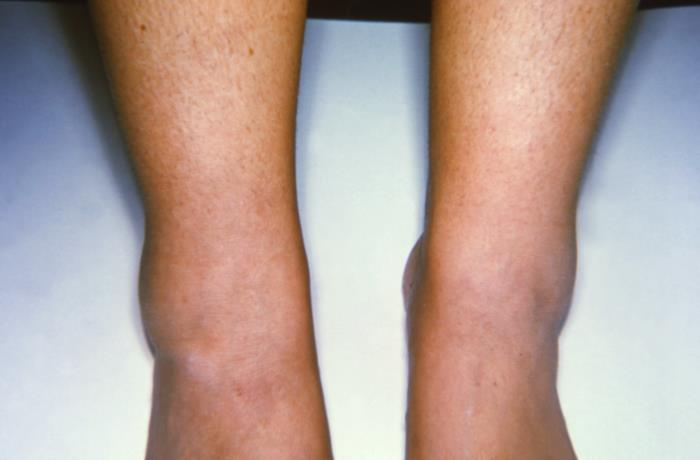
Signs of arthritis. Swelling of the ankle joints which is indicative of an underlying inflammatory process.

== Types of arthritis ==
=== Osteoarthritis ===
Osteoarthritis (OA) is caused by the wear and tear damage to the joint's cartilage.

The compelling pharmacological recommendations for the treatment of OA are oral NSAIDs, topical NSAIDs (for hands and knees), and intra-articular steroids. Other conditionally recommended therapies include acetaminophen, tramadol, duloxetine, chondroitin, and topical capsaicin.

=== Rheumatoid arthritis ===
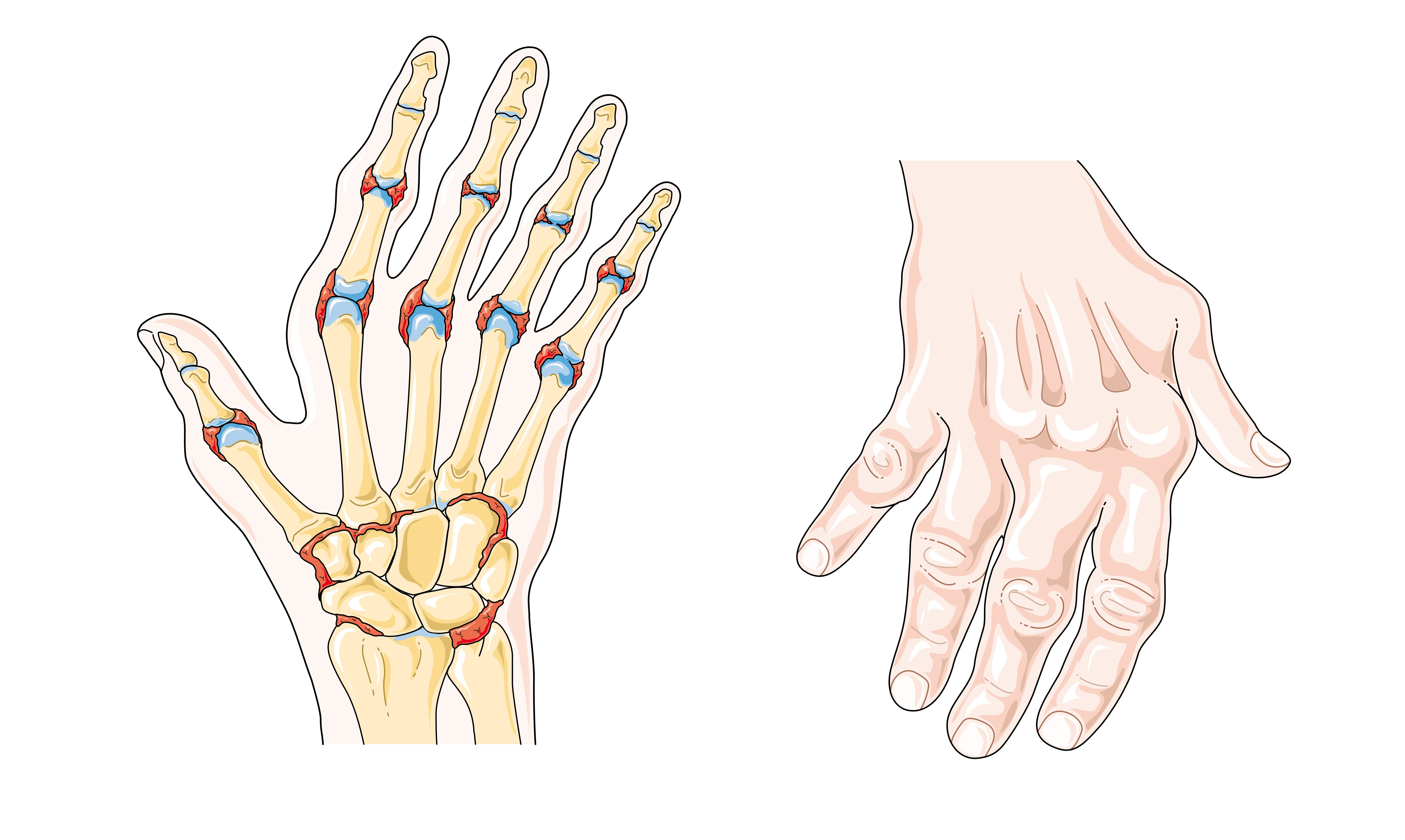
Illustration of a hand affected by rheumatoid arthritis

Rheumatoid arthritis (RA) is an inflammatory disease that's caused by an autoimmune condition. The condition occurs when bodily cells begin to attack and target their own healthy joint tissues resulting in redness, inflammation, and pain. Patients with RA may be given antiarthritics that are used to block inflammation and help prevent joint damage.

The typical first-line pharmacological recommendation for patients with symptomatic rheumatoid arthritis is DMARD monotherapy (methotrexate preferred). In moderate or severe disease activity, it is recommended to combine conventional DMARDs, add a TNF-α inhibitors or a non-TNF biologic or tofacitinib.

=== Gout ===
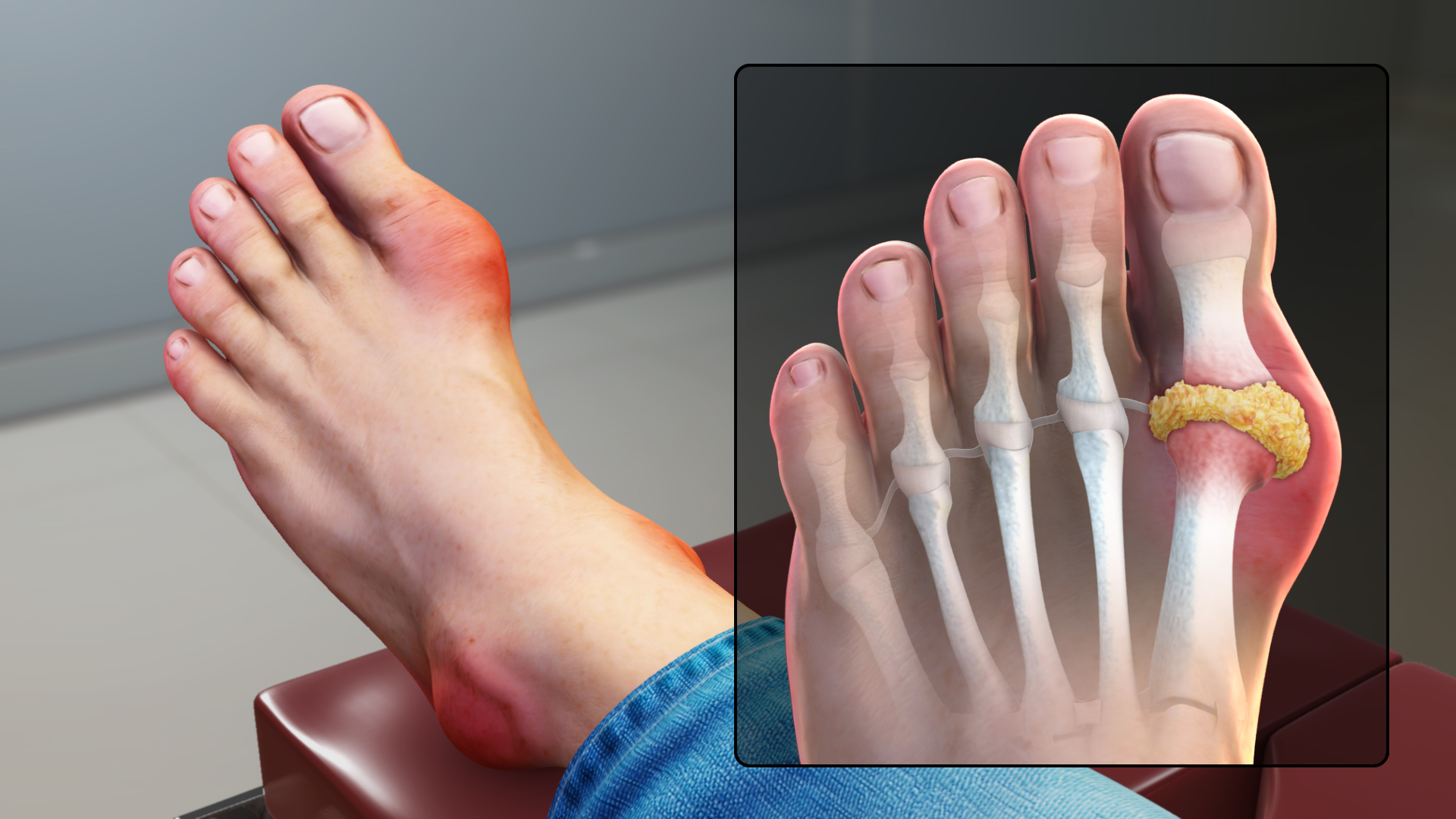
Gout swelling of the big toe

Gout is another common type of inflammatory arthritis that typically affects one joint at a time. Pharmacological treatment of gout typically relies on the management of flare-ups. Flare-ups are treated with the use of nonsteroidal anti-inflammatory drugs (NSAIDs) like ibuprofen, steroids, and/or the anti-inflammatory medication colchicine.

=== Juvenile rheumatoid arthritis ===
Juvenile rheumatoid arthritis, the most common type of childhood (under age of 16) arthritis, can cause permanent physical damage to joints. Pharmacological interventions include NSAIDs (naproxen, ibuprofen, and indometacin), intra-articular corticosteroid (IAC) injections like triamcinolone hexacetonide (TH), conventional DMARDs (methotrexate), and TNF inhibitors such as etanercept.

== Medical use ==
Antiarthritic drugs are used to treat or prevent joint pain and joint diseases. These medications also provide symptomatic relief to common arthritic joint symptoms including swelling, tenderness, pain, stiffness, and decreased range of motion. These symptoms may persist or occur periodically and if symptoms are not managed, major complications may develop including permanent joint changes, chronic pain, and functional disabilities. Ultimately, antiarthritic treatments aim to achieve disease remission or low disease activity if remission cannot be achieved and thereby improving quality of life.

The pharmacological effects of antiarthritic medications are typically exerted through the reduction of inflammation, suppression of the immune system and/or aid in easing pain.

== Disease-modifying antirheumatic drugs (DMARDs) ==
Disease-modifying antirheumatic drugs (DMARDs) are often used to decrease inflammation at the site of injury for RA. DMARDs also act to relieve pain and decrease progression and worsening of RA. It mainly functions by slowing or stopping the immune system from attacking the joints.

Conventional DMARDs are known to be the first-line treatment for rheumatoid arthritis. Treatment can be a monotherapy or in combination with other anti-arthritic medications. Common DMARDs include oral methotrexate, leflunomide, or sulfasalazine.

Conventional DMARDs have a slow onset of action and can take 2–3 months to exhibit effect. Short-term bridging treatment with a corticosteroid is often considered when introducing a treatment with a new conventional DMARD. The use of short-term corticosteroids will help with a rapid symptomatic relief while waiting for the DMARD to exert effect.

=== Methotrexate ===
Methotrexate is considered to be the preferred conventional DMARD to treat RA. Route of administration includes oral tablets and liquids as well as intravenous and subcutaneous injections.

==== Mechanism of action ====
Methotrexate is a DMARD that acts as a competitive inhibitor on the enzyme dihydrofolate reductase and hinders the formation of tetrahydrofolate. Tetrahydrofolate is essential for the synthesis of purine and pyrimidine which consequently controls the formation of DNA and RNA that are responsible for the immune response and inflammation. By preventing the formation of tetrahydrofolate and the subsequent proteins, DMARDs suppress the immune response and reduce arthritis inflammation.

==== Side effects ====
Methotrexate is commonly associated with dose-related toxic effects involving the bone marrow and gastrointestinal tract. Folic acid may be given weekly to help diminish the frequency of side-effects. Methotrexate is also associated with acute and chronic liver damage.

Other adverse effects include:

- Life-threatening interstitial lung disease
- Tubular necrosis
- Renal failure
- Skin reactions
- Alopecia
- Ocular irritation.

Folic acid (vitamin B9) may be given by medical practitioners during the drug therapy using methotrexate. Folic acid acts to provide protection for the healthy cells in the human body. As such, it will help to reduce the side effects of methotrexate.

==== Contraindications ====
Contraindications of methotrexate include:

- Patient with active infection
- Ascites
- Immunodeficiency syndromes
- Pleural effusion.

In addition, methotrexate is teratogenic and has been associated with fetal deaths. As a consequence, it is avoided during pregnancy.

=== Biologic response modifiers ===
Biologic response modifiers (biological therapies) are drugs classified as a special type of DMARDs. It is typically administered when conventional DMARDs do not work. It is genetically engineered to target various proteins that are involved in the immune response. The route of administration is available through intravenous or subcutaneous injection.

Biologic response modifiers are commonly used as a monotherapy or in combination with non-biologics, such as methotrexate. Combination of biologics is not advised due to limited additional benefit accompanied with a substantial increase in risks.

Biologic response modifiers can be divided into classes based on protein molecules that it inhibits such as tumor necrosis factor (TNF), interleukin-1 (IL-1), interleukin-6 (IL-6), and white blood cells like B cells or T cells.

==== Mechanism of action ====
Biologic response modifiers act by altering the immune response of the human body. The mechanism of action is either through interfering with the effect of cytokines, inhibiting the costimulation of T cell activation, or inhibiting B cells. Cytokines are proinflammatory and are responsible for regulating the human immune response.

==== TNF-α inhibitors ====
TNF-α Inhibitors are the most commonly prescribed medication among biologic response modifiers used to treat arthritis. Patients with rheumatic conditions may have higher levels of TNF in the systemic circulation. As a result of increased levels of TNF, there would be more inflammation and persistent symptoms of arthritis. Certolizumab is the only TNF-α Inhibitor that can be administered during pregnancy.

Examples:

- Adalimumab
- Certolizumab
- Etanercept
- Golimumab
- Infliximab

==== Interleukin inhibitors ====
IL-1 and IL-6 are particularly involved as proinflammatory cytokines contributing to arthritic symptoms. The inhibition of these cytokines is effective in reducing inflammation and consequently reducing the severity of arthritis.

Examples:

- Anakinra
- Tocilizumab
- Canakinumab
- Secukinumab
- Ustekinumab
- Ixekizumab
- Sarilumab

==== Selective costimulation modulator of T cells ====
Selective costimulation modulator of T cells is a type of biologic that targets the inhibition of T cell activation as well as the selective blocking of the interaction between CD80 and CD86 receptors to CD28. To prevent CD28 interaction with the CD80/CD86 receptors, these drugs modulate by binding to these receptors on antigen presenting cells (APC). As a result, this type of biologic inhibits T cell proliferation and B cell immunological response.

Abatacept is available as an antiarthritic medication for moderate to severe RA. This biologic can also be used to treat patients with juvenile rheumatoid arthritis.

Examples:

- Abatacept

==== B cells inhibitor ====
B cells, or B lymphocytes are a type of white blood cells that contribute to the pathogenesis of RA. B cells have a variety of functions including being an efficient APC, contribute to T cell activation, produce cytokines that promote the permeation of leukocytes into the joints and more. The therapeutic effect of B cells inhibitor is dependent on the disruption of these diverse functions.

Examples:

- Belimumab
- Rituximab

==== Side effects ====
The adverse reactions of biologic response modifier therapies are associated with their mechanism of action that disrupts the immune homeostasis of the human body. These inhibitory biologics cause suppression of the immune response resulting in an increase in risk and susceptibility to infection.

Common infections include:

- Colds
- Upper respiratory tract infection
- Sinus infection
- Sore throat
- Bronchitis
- Urinary tract infection

It may also cause mild side effects such as headache and nausea.

== Janus kinase inhibitors ==
Janus kinase (JAK) inhibitors are used to treat RA. Similar to biologic response modifiers, these drugs act to reduce immune response. However, these medications are available in tablet formulations, unlike biologics.

Examples:

- Tofacitinib
- Baricitinib

=== Mechanism of action ===
JAK inhibitors act by inhibiting Janus kinases which consequently affect a cascade of enzymes responsible for signaling a variety of cytokine and haematopoietic growth factor receptors. As a consequence, inhibiting these enzymes leads to the control and suppression of immune pathways.

=== Side effects ===
The common side effect of using JAK inhibitors is the increased susceptibility to infections. For example:

- Pneumonia and bronchitis
- Nose, throat or windpipe infections
- Urinary bladder infection (cystitis)
- Other viral infections such as shingles and influenza

== Analgesics ==
Analgesics or painkillers are defined as medications that help to manage and reduce pain. It is often used in treatments of arthritis to provide relief on the site of injury. Acetaminophen, opioids and counterirritants are common analgesics used in the therapy of arthritis. However, these drugs have no control over inflammation.

=== Acetaminophen ===
Acetaminophen (paracetamol) is a common over-the-counter option to manage pain. It is commonly used to relieve mild to moderate severity of pain. There are various routes of administration including oral, rectal and intravenous. Acetaminophen is often recommended in treating osteoarthritic patients.

==== Mechanism of action ====
Despite the mechanism of action of acetaminophen is not completely understood, it appears to act on the COX pathway. It reduces COX activity by inhibiting the synthesis of prostaglandins in the central nervous system. The reduction of COX activity contributes to its analgesic effects.

==== Side effects ====
Hepatotoxicity is often associated with the overdose of acetaminophen causing acute liver failure. The maximum recommended daily dosage for an adult is 4000 mg.

=== Opioids ===
In more severe cases of arthritic pain, opioids may be prescribed by the general practitioner. For example, tramadol, oxycodone or hydrocodone.

==== Mechanism of action ====
Opioids function on the central nervous system to provide pain relief. The long term use of opioids has been associated with mental and physical side effects including drug dependence.

==== Side effects ====
Common side effects of opioids include:

- drowsiness
- sedation
- constipation
- nausea
- slowed breathing.

=== Counterirritants ===
Counterirritant is a drug that belongs to the analgesic class. Typically, these agents are in topical formulations such as ointments and creams that contain menthol or capsaicin. It only provides modest pain relief and is not effective for managing severe pain.

==== Mechanism of action ====
Counterirritants act by exciting and subsequently desensitizing epidermal nociceptive sensory neurons. When applied to the site of injury, it produces a heating sensation and consequently surface irritation of the skin. This sensation interferes with the transmission of pain signals from the joints to the brain. Thereby distracting the brain from pain.

==== Side effects ====
Topical therapies minimize systemic exposure and reduce the risks of patients developing adverse events that are common with orally administered pain management medications such as NSAIDs. However, counterirritants are associated with undesirable reactions at the site of application. Typical side effects include dryness, erythema, burning, and discoloration.

== Nonsteroidal anti-inflammatory drugs ==
Nonsteroidal anti-inflammatory drugs (NSAIDs) belongs to a drug class that has both analgesic and anti-inflammatory effects. NSAIDs can often be found over-the-counter including ibuprofen and naproxen. There may be exceptions to which some NSAIDs are only available by prescription. Oral NSAIDs may cause discomfort to the stomach and may also increase the risk of heart attack or stroke. Other formulation types are also available, such as creams or gels that can be applied directly to the joints.

=== Mechanism of action ===
NSAIDs exhibit their pharmacological effects through the inhibition of the cyclooxygenase (COX) enzyme. COX is a necessary protein that facilitates the conversion of arachidonic acid into thromboxanes, prostaglandins, and prostacyclins. When the COX activity is inhibited, the synthesis of the subsequent eicosanoids is reduced. As a result, NSAIDs produce analgesic and anti-inflammatory effects.

=== Side effects ===
Similar to corticosteroids, NSAIDs should be used for short periods of time due to the risk of side effects. Common side effects of NSAIDs include

- stomach ulcers
- headaches, drowsiness
- allergic reactions.

Rarer side effects consist of complications affecting the liver, kidneys or heart and circulation, potentiating the cause of heart failure, heart attacks and strokes.

== Corticosteroids ==
Corticosteroid is a class of drugs that features the reduction of inflammation and suppression of the immune system. Common medication includes prednisone and cortisone. These corticosteroids can be taken orally or can be injected directly into the painful joints.

Due to the extensive risk of side effects associated with the use of corticosteroids, it is generally recommended for short term therapy. For example, during a flare-up or an episode of arthritic symptoms, short-term corticosteroids are administered to rapidly decrease inflammation of the joints.

=== Mechanism of action ===
Corticosteroids mediates multiple steps in the inflammatory pathway. To exert an effect, the steroid compound binds to glucocorticoid receptors. As a result, the receptors changes their conformation and influences glucocorticoid response elements. These elements are connected with either suppression or stimulating transcription of genes responsible for ribonucleic acid and protein synthesis. Corticosteroids are responsible for inhibiting transcription factors that control the synthesis of proinflammatory molecules, including macrophages, eosinophils, lymphocytes, mast cells, and dendritic cells. Corticosteroids also exert their effect by inhibiting phospholipase A2. Phospholipase A2 controls the production of various inflammatory mediators.

=== Side effects ===
Injected corticosteroids may cause:

- gastrointestinal irritation
- discomfort
- tachycardia
- nausea
- insomnia
- metallic taste in the mouth.

Patients taking short term oral corticosteroids may experience:

- mood alterations (feeling anxious or irritated)
- insomnia
- fluid retention
- an increase in appetite.

Long term usage may lead to more severe complications including:

- osteoporosis
- hypertension
- diabetes
- muscle weakness
- increased vulnerability to infection
- glaucoma.

In case of facing severe side effects, the drug should not be stopped suddenly. If corticosteroids are stopped abruptly, the patient may experience fatigue, nausea, vomiting, diarrhoea, and abdominal pain.

== See also ==
- Arthritis
- Osteoarthritis
- Rheumatoid Arthritis
- Gout
- Juvenile rheumatoid arthritis
- Disease-modifying antirheumatic drugs
- Biologic response modifiers
- Janus Kinase Inhibitors
- Analgesics
- Opioids
- Counterirritants
- Nonsteroidal anti-inflammatory drugs
- Corticosteroids
- Osteoporosis
- Hypertension
- Diabetes
- Heart Failure
- Stroke
- Glaucoma
