= Pelubiprofen =

Chemical compound

Clinical data
- Trade names: Pelubi
- ATC code: M01AE20 (WHO)

Legal status
- Legal status: Rx in several countries

Identifiers
- IUPAC name: 2-[4-[(E)-(2-Oxocyclohexylidene)methyl]phenyl]propanoic acid
- CAS Number: 69956-77-0
- PubChem CID: 5282203
- DrugBank: DB12150
- UNII: 1619C79FVJ
- CompTox Dashboard (EPA): DTXSID2048795

Chemical and physical data
- Formula: C_{16}H_{18}O_{3}
- Molar mass: 258.317 g·mol^{−1}
- 3D model (JSmol): Interactive image
- SMILES: CC(C1=CC=C(C=C1)/C=C/2\CCCCC2=O)C(=O)O
- InChI: InChI=1S/C16H18O3/c1-11(16(18)19)13-8-6-12(7-9-13)10-14-4-2-3-5-15(14)17/h6-11H,2-5H2,1H3,(H,18,19)/b14-10+; Key:AUZUGWXLBGZUPP-GXDHUFHOSA-N

Pelubiprofen is a nonsteroidal anti-inflammatory drug of the profen class used to treat back pain and osteoarthritis.

Pelubiprofen was developed in South Korea by Daewon Pharmaceuticals and it is marketed in Korea and Russia, among other countries.

== Research ==
Pelubiprofen is being studied for use in combination with eperisone.

Because pelubiprofen has low water solubility, development of salt formulations with better solubility is being studied.

== Synthesis ==
Pelubiprofen can be prepared by the reaction of 1-(1-piperidino)cyclohexene (1) with ethyl 2-(4-formylphenyl)propanoate (2).

Synthesis of pelubiprofen
