= Viral arthritis (disambiguation) =

Humans

Viral arthritis in Humans (also see: arthralgia) can be caused by:

- Parvovirus, especially parvovirus B19
- Hepatitis B
- Hepatitis C
- Rubella
- Alphaviruses

Non-Humans

- Viral arthritis (poultry), an infectious conditions seen chicken and turkeys
