= Lilly Research Centre =

- Erl Wood Manor
- Location within Surrey
- Alternative names: Erl Wood, Eli Lilly Research & Development, Eli Lilly Campus

General information
- Type: Medical Research Centre
- Location: Surrey, England, GU20 6PH
- Coordinates: 51.3764°N 0.6776°W
- Elevation: 70 m (230 ft)
- Current tenants: 600 employees
- Completed: August 1967
- Inaugurated: 1967
- Cost: £1.5m
- Client: Lilly Industries
- Owner: Eli Lilly Corporation

Dimensions
- Other dimensions: 47 acres

Technical details
- Floor count: 2
- Floor area: 23,154 sq ft

Design and construction
- Main contractor: McAlpine

The Lilly Research Centre is a medical research centre in Surrey. It is the European headquarters of Eli Lilly and Company.

== Construction ==
Lilly received permission for the site in 1959. The site was built by McAlpine. The site was to open by August 1967, being 47 acres

From 1967 the catering was provided by the Bateman Catering Organisation

== History ==
The former research site of Lilly was at Bromborough.

In 1968, when the centre opened, Eli Lilly was spending £20m on research in the UK. The average research cost of a new molecular entity is currently over £1bn. In 2003, a £40m investment transformed the site into a Centre of Excellence in Neuroscience Research.

Director of Research at the centre was Bill Dawson, a Fellow of the Royal Pharmaceutical Society of Great Britain.

In October 2019, Eli Lilly announced the closure of their Erl Wood research centre by the end of 2020 with some staff moving to other Eli Lilly locations in the local area and neuroscience research moving to the USA. A year later, in October 2020, UCB announced they had acquired the site from Lilly and would complete a refurbishment of the site.

=== Visits ===
- It was featured in a two-part Panorama documentary on 10 and 17 January 1983, presented by Tom Mangold.
- Prince Andrew, Duke of York visited the site on 11 June 2003.

=== Directors ===
- David Dennen
- John Wold 1983-
- Paul Johnson 2002-2007
- Karin Briner 2007-10

== Operation ==
From 1967 the catering was provided by the Bateman Catering Organisation.

=== Research ===
The site had laboratory animals. A new £1.3m centre for Elanco Products opened in November 1978, with 12,500 sq ft. The site also researched plant science, where chemists developed pesticide formulation.

The pain killer benoxaprofen (known as Opren) was developed at the site in 1971, and launched on Tuesday 14 October 1980, and had been in hospitals since May 1980. It had to be rapidly withdrawn on 4 August 1982, as there were numerous side-effects, with maybe up to 61 deaths in the UK. It was banned by the government on 6 September 1982.

== Structure ==
It is accessed via the A30 and B3020, and the A322 via junction 3 of the M3. The site has a 200-seat restaurant. The EMC building opened in 2000. The site is set in woodland.

== See also ==
- British Neuroscience Association
- Napp Research Centre in South Cambridgeshire
