= Vedaprofen =

NSAID analgesic veterinary drug

Names
- IUPAC name 2-(4-Cyclohexyl-1-naphthyl)propanoic acid
- Other names Quadrisol

Identifiers
CAS Number	71109-09-6
3D model (JSmol)	Interactive image
ChEBI	CHEBI:32292
ChEMBL	ChEMBL2104464
ChemSpider	65131
ECHA InfoCard	100.068.339
PubChem CID	72158
UNII	OKX88EO7OI
CompTox Dashboard (EPA)	DTXSID5049077
- InChI: InChI=1S/C19H22O2/c1-13(19(20)21)15-11-12-16(14-7-3-2-4-8-14)18-10-6-5-9-17(15)18/h5-6,9-14H,2-4,7-8H2,1H3,(H,20,21) Key: VZUGVMQFWFVFBX-UHFFFAOYSA-N; InChI=1/C19H22O2/c1-13(19(20)21)15-11-12-16(14-7-3-2-4-8-14)18-10-6-5-9-17(15)18/h5-6,9-14H,2-4,7-8H2,1H3,(H,20,21) Key: VZUGVMQFWFVFBX-UHFFFAOYAU
- SMILES: O=C(O)C(c2ccc(c1ccccc12)C3CCCCC3)C

Properties
Chemical formula	C_{19}H_{22}O_{2}
Molar mass	282.383 g·mol^{−1}

Pharmacology
ATCvet code	QM01AE90 (WHO)
Legal status	EU: Rx-only
- Except where otherwise noted, data are given for materials in their standard state (at 25 °C [77 °F], 100 kPa). Infobox references

Vedaprofen is a nonsteroidal anti-inflammatory drug (NSAID) used in veterinary medicine for the treatment of pain and inflammation due to musculoskeletal disorders in dogs and horses and for the treatment of pain due to horse colic. It is a member of the profen drug class.

== Medical uses ==
Vedaprofen is indicated for the reduction of inflammation and relief of pain associated with musculo-skeletal disorders and soft tissue lesions (traumatic injuries and surgical trauma).

== Synthesis ==
Vedaprofen can be synthesized beginning with 1-cyclohexylnaphthylene (left). Chloromethylation followed by functional group interconversion provides the ester (center right). Alkylation with methyl iodide then gives vedaprofen (right).

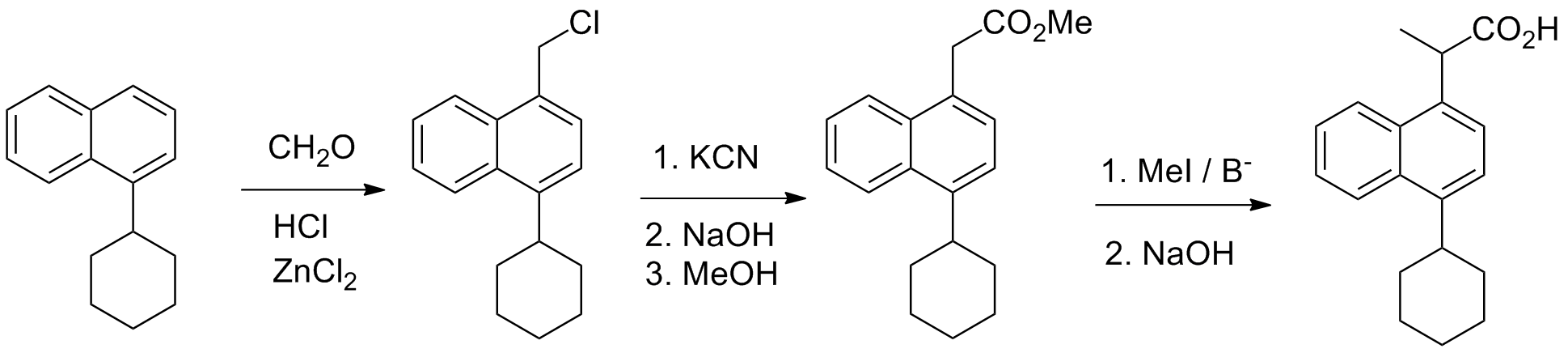
Vedaprofen synthesis:

== Society and culture ==
=== Legal status ===
Vedaprofen was approved for veterinary use in the European Union in April 1997.
