= 2-Aminofluorene =

- Structure of 2-aminofluorene

Names
- Systematic IUPAC name 9H-Fluoren-2-amine
- Other names 2-Fluorenamine; 2-fluoreneamine

Identifiers
CAS Number	153-78-6
3D model (JSmol)	Interactive image
Abbreviations	2-AF
ChEBI	CHEBI:40598
ChEMBL	ChEMBL84472
ChemSpider	1484
ECHA InfoCard	100.005.290
EC Number	205-817-8
PubChem CID	1539
UNII	3A69OS195N
UN number	2811
CompTox Dashboard (EPA)	DTXSID1049223
- InChI: InChI=1S/C13H11N/c14-11-5-6-13-10(8-11)7-9-3-1-2-4-12(9)13/h1-6,8H,7,14H2 Key: CFRFHWQYWJMEJN-UHFFFAOYSA-N
- SMILES: c1cccc3c1c2c(cc(N)cc2)C3

Properties
Chemical formula	C_{13}H_{11}N
Molar mass	181.238 g·mol^{−1}
Appearance	White to tan solid
Melting point	125–132 °C (257–270 °F; 398–405 K)
Solubility in water	<.1 g/100 mL at 19.5 °C

Hazards
- Occupational safety and health (OHS/OSH)
Main hazards	Cytotoxic
- GHS labelling
Pictograms	(GHS08: Health hazard)
Signal word	Warning
Hazard statements	H341, H351
Precautionary statements	P201, P280, P308+P313
- Except where otherwise noted, data are given for materials in their standard state (at 25 °C [77 °F], 100 kPa). Infobox references

2-Aminofluorene (2-AF) is a synthetic arylamine. It is a white to tan solid with a melting point of 125-132 °C. 2-AF has only been tested in controlled laboratory settings thus far. There is no indication that it will be tested in industrialized settings. There is evidence that 2-aminofluorene is a carcinogen and an intercalating agent that is extremely dangerous to genomic DNA that potentially can lead to mutation if not death. Furthermore, it has been suggested that 2-aminofluorene can undergo acetylation reactions that causes these reactive species to undergo such reactions in cells. Several experiments have been conducted that have suggested 2-aminofluorene be treated with care and with an overall awareness of the toxicity of this compound.

== Structure and properties ==
2-Aminofluorene is used in laboratory research settings, in which it is converted into differentiating substances that can be harmful to deoxyribonucleic acids. Reactive species can be formed from its original structure. 2-AF has 3 cyclic rings: a benzene attached to a cyclopentane which is attached to another benzene. The functional group is a primary amine, which can act as a hydrogen donor or acceptor under certain conditions. Therefore, it can become reactive under such laboratory settings.

2-Aminofluorene is a relatively bulky molecule. The average mass is about 181 daltons and its melting point ranges from 125 °C-132 °C. This molecule can be converted to other molecules when metabolized. Therefore, it is mostly used as a model compound that can help researches study carcinogens and the functionality of such compounds that are similar in structure to 2-AF. 2-Acetylaminofluorene (2-AAF) is used similarly to 2-AF because of the nature of these molecules.

== Uses in research ==
There have been experiments carried out using 2-AF as a possible mutagen that can be introduced into a host species. For example, it has been shown that human leukocytes are able to metabolize 2-AF into a human mutagen. When inserted into Salmonella, it was noted that 2-AF was metabolized and created a mutagenic strain of Salmonella. In other species, 2-AF was also the cause of mutations in the host genome. The leukocytes, in particular, were able to uptake 2-AF and the researchers were able to conclude that the metabolism of 2-AF was the precursor to the tumor formation.

== Toxicity and reactions ==
2-AF can undergo a reaction to become 2-acetylaminofluorene (2-AAF), which is a carcinogen to animals. This compound has been a major research area for cancer-causing agents. 2-AAF is able to cause tumors in mice and other animals in the liver and kidney. This substance can act as a substrate for cytochrome P450 (CYP) which adds a hydroxyl group to the amino group producing N-hydroxy-2-acetylaminofluorene, which is a carcinogen. The addition of these side groups to 2-AF are very dangerous in biological systems. The transferase enzyme cytosolic N-acetyltransferase can act on the hydroxyl group which can also be acetylated. This oxygen acetylation will create the intermediate N-acetyl-N-acetoxyaminofluorene. The side groups of the N-acteyl-N-acetoxyaminofluorene can form the arylamidonium ion and a carbonium ion which can interact directly with DNA. Exposure to these carcinogens can increase metabolic rates, if the exposure is repeated several times. This is carcinogenic and exposure should be limited. These carcinogens can affect the genome induce mutations. Furthermore, the N-hydroxy derivative can undergo sulfation by the enzyme cytosolic sulfur transferase, which will produce another compound, N-acetyl-N-sulfoxy.

== Biological interactions ==
2-AF is able to induce tumors in the livers of male and female rats. Additionally, this chemical can cause mammary gland tumors in female rats. Its carcinogenic nature introduces rare tumors in the ear ducts and small intestines in rats. 2-AF is a mutagen and causes genetic mutations, DNA damage, chromosomal transformations, and sister-chromatid exchanges in animal genomes. In biological systems, the conversion of 2-AF to different forms can react with DNA.

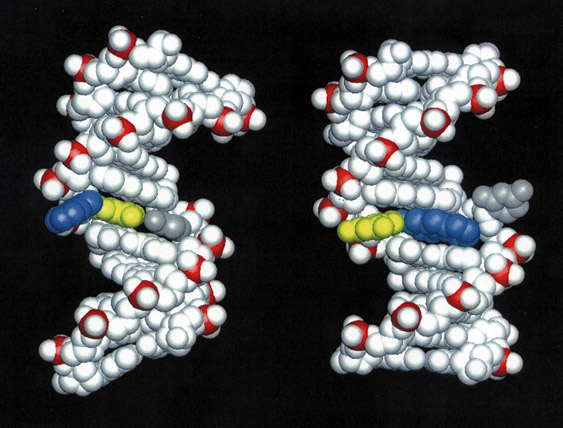
DNA damaged by 2-aminofluorene

In molecular biology, 2-AF is able to induce frameshift mutations, by deleting 2 bases in the DNA. DNA is able to undergo a transition from one conformation form, B-DNA, to another, Z-DNA. B-DNA is the natural state that DNA is found in animals, and shifting the conformation to Z-DNA is especially harmful to biological systems. Z-DNA has less base pairs per turn and in turn, the DNA is more reactive and unable to act under normal conditions. This form of DNA will not be able to interact with enzymes, histone proteins, and other molecules the way it normally would. The implications of this reaction is that site-specific or non-specific interactions with other molecules is severely shifted to be prone to mutations during replication of the genome. If DNA mutations occur during DNA replication, this will ultimately affect the central dogma and every protein that gets translated. Mutations ultimately affect the production of proteins and at times, it can be quite fatal.

== Applications ==
2-AF is not common in industrial settings. It is, though, commonly used in laboratory settings because of mutagenic nature. The observation of 2-aminofluorene that it is related to genetic mutations, DNA damage, chromosomal aberrations, and sister-chromatid exchanges.
