= Indoprofen =

Withdrawn NSAID drug

Clinical data
- Routes of administration: Oral
- ATC code: M01AE10 (WHO)

Legal status
- Legal status: Withdrawn

Pharmacokinetic data
- Bioavailability: High (rapid and complete absorption)
- Metabolism: Glucuronidation
- Elimination half-life: 2.3 hours
- Excretion: Renal

Identifiers
- IUPAC name: 2-[4-(1-oxo-1,3-dihydro-2H-isoindol-2-yl) phenyl]propanoic acid
- CAS Number: 31842-01-0
- PubChem CID: 3718
- DrugBank: DB08951
- ChemSpider: 3587
- UNII: CPE46ZU14N
- KEGG: D04530
- ChEBI: CHEBI:76162
- ChEMBL: ChEMBL15870
- CompTox Dashboard (EPA): DTXSID5045831
- ECHA InfoCard: 100.046.197

Chemical and physical data
- Formula: C_{17}H_{15}NO_{3}
- Molar mass: 281.311 g·mol^{−1}
- 3D model (JSmol): Interactive image
- SMILES: O=C(O)C(c1ccc(cc1)N3C(=O)c2ccccc2C3)C
- InChI: InChI=1S/C17H15NO3/c1-11(17(20)21)12-6-8-14(9-7-12)18-10-13-4-2-3-5-15(13)16(18)19/h2-9,11H,10H2,1H3,(H,20,21); Key:RJMIEHBSYVWVIN-UHFFFAOYSA-N

Indoprofen is a nonsteroidal anti-inflammatory drug (NSAID). It was withdrawn worldwide in the 1980s after postmarketing reports of severe gastrointestinal bleeding.

A 2004 study using high-throughput screening found indoprofen to increase production of the survival of motor neuron protein, suggesting it may provide insight into treatments for spinal muscular atrophies.

== Synthesis ==
The isoindolone ring system forms the nucleus for this profen NSAID.

The nitro group in 2-(4-nitrophenyl)propionic acid (1) is reduced using iron and hydrochloric acid to give 2-(4-aminophenyl)propionic acid (2). Reaction with phthalic anhydride then gives the phthalimide (4). Treatment with zinc in acetic acid yields indoprofen after reduction of one of the amide groups.

== See also ==
- Indobufen
