= Hydroxyacetylaminofluorene =

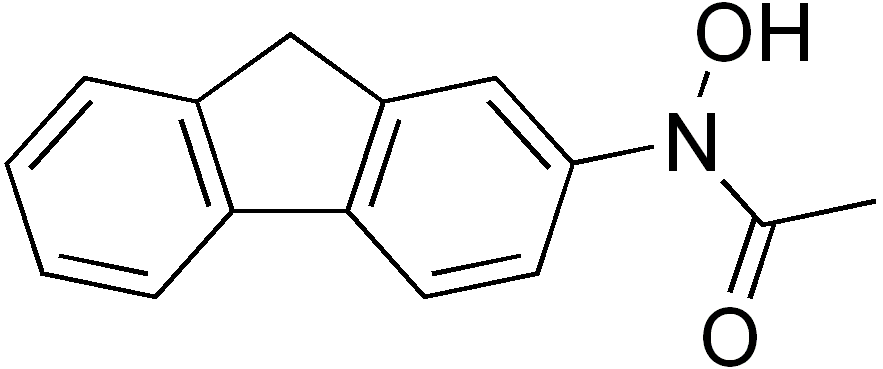

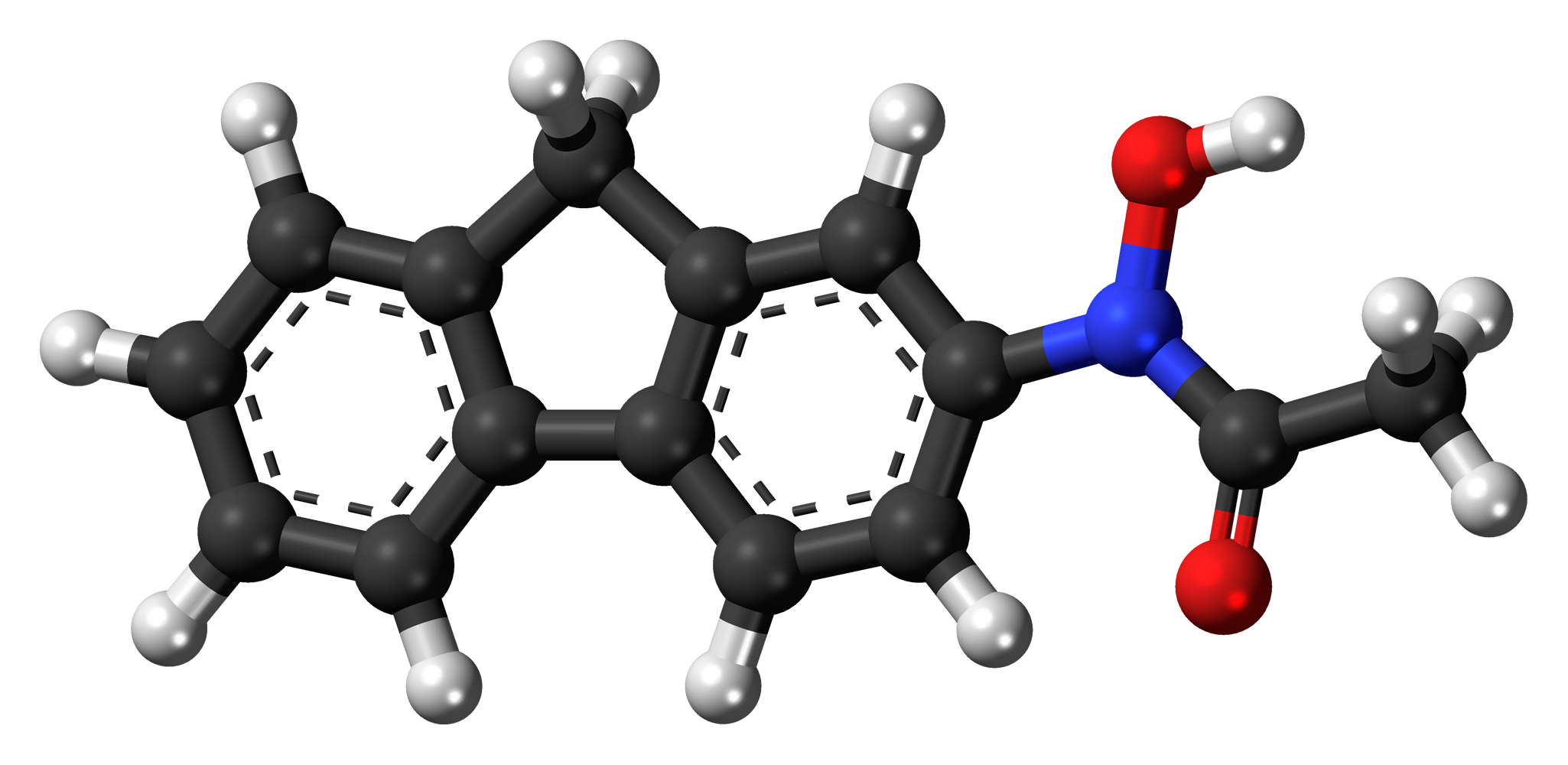

Names
- Preferred IUPAC name N-(9H-Fluoren-2-yl)-N-hydroxyacetamide
- Other names N-Hydroxy-2-acetamidofluorene; Hydroxyfluorenylacetamide

Identifiers
CAS Number	53-95-2
3D model (JSmol)	Interactive image
ChemSpider	5685
KEGG	C03954
PubChem CID	5896
UNII	6AGD02HUQC
CompTox Dashboard (EPA)	DTXSID2020719
- InChI: InChI=1S/C15H13NO2/c1-10(17)16(18)13-6-7-15-12(9-13)8-11-4-2-3-5-14(11)15/h2-7,9,18H,8H2,1H3 Key: SOKUIEGXJHVFDV-UHFFFAOYSA-N
- SMILES: CC(=O)N(C1=CC2=C(C=C1)C3=CC=CC=C3C2)O

Properties
Chemical formula	C_{15}H_{13}NO_{2}
Molar mass	239.27 g/mol
- Except where otherwise noted, data are given for materials in their standard state (at 25 °C [77 °F], 100 kPa). verify (what is ?) Infobox references

Hydroxyacetylaminofluorene is a derivative of 2-acetylaminofluorene used as a biochemical tool in the study of carcinogenesis.

== Biochemistry ==
N-hydroxy-2-acetamidofluorene reductase is an enzyme that catalyzes the conversion of the carcinogen, hydroxyacetylaminofluorene to 2-acetylaminofluorene. It uses reduced nicotinamide adenine dinucleotide (NADH) as its cofactor.

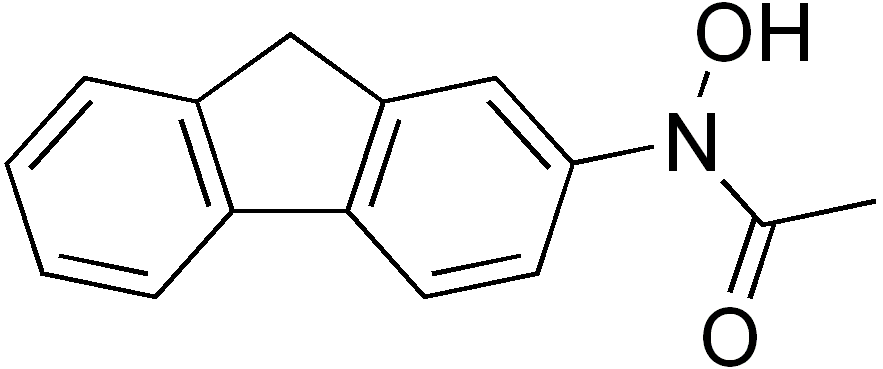
hydroxyacetylaminofluorene
+ NADH
H^{+}
H_{2}O
H^{+}
H_{2}O
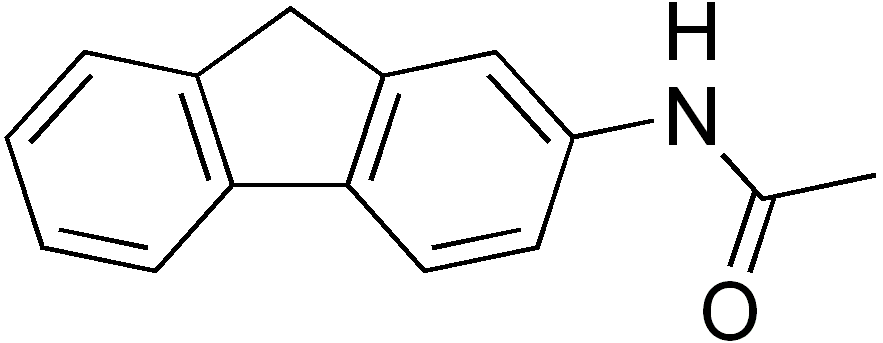
2-acetylaminofluorene
+ NAD^{+}

== See also ==
- Acetoxyacetylaminofluorene
