= Esomeprazole =

Medication which reduces stomach acid

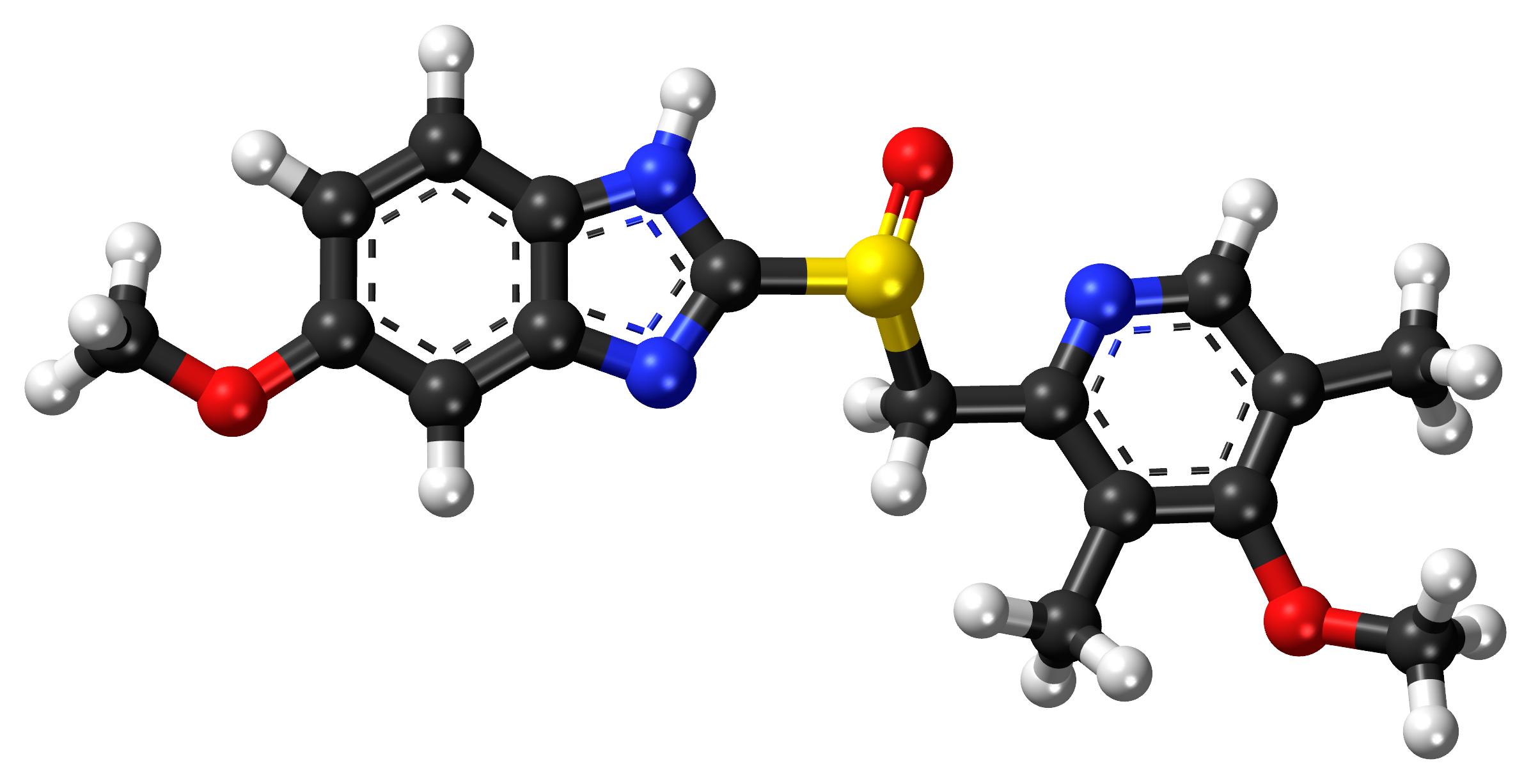

Clinical data
- Pronunciation: /ˌɛsoʊˈmɛprəˌzoʊl, -ˈmiː-, -ˌzɒl/
- Trade names: Nexium, others
- AHFS/Drugs.com: Monograph
- MedlinePlus: a699054
- License data: US DailyMed: Esomeprazole
- Pregnancy category: AU: B3
- Routes of administration: By mouth, intravenous
- Drug class: Proton pump inhibitor
- ATC code: A02BC05 (WHO)

Legal status
- Legal status: AU: S2 (Pharmacy medicine) / S4 (Prescription Only Medicine); CA: ℞-only; UK: General sales list (GSL, OTC); US: OTC / Rx-only; EU: OTC

Pharmacokinetic data
- Bioavailability: 50 to 90%
- Metabolism: Liver (CYP2C19, CYP3A4)
- Elimination half-life: 1–1.5 hours
- Excretion: 80% Kidney; 20% Feces

Identifiers
- IUPAC name: (S)-(−)-5-Methoxy-2-[(4-methoxy-3,5-dimethylpyridin-2-yl)methylsulfinyl]-3H-benzoimidazole
- CAS Number: 119141-88-7
- PubChem CID: 9579578
- DrugBank: DB00736
- ChemSpider: 7843323
- UNII: N3PA6559FT
- KEGG: D07917; as salt: D01984
- ChEBI: CHEBI:50275
- ChEMBL: ChEMBL1201320
- CompTox Dashboard (EPA): DTXSID4044292
- ECHA InfoCard: 100.149.048

Chemical and physical data
- Formula: C_{17}H_{19}N_{3}O_{3}S
- Molar mass: 345.42 g·mol^{−1}
- 3D model (JSmol): Interactive image
- SMILES: COc1ccc2nc([nH]c2c1)[S@](=O)Cc1ncc(C)c(OC)c1C
- InChI: InChI=1S/C17H19N3O3S/c1-10-8-18-15(11(2)16(10)23-4)9-24(21)17-19-13-6-5-12(22-3)7-14(13)20-17/h5-8H,9H2,1-4H3,(H,19,20)/t24-/m1/s1; Key:SUBDBMMJDZJVOS-XMMPIXPASA-N

Esomeprazole, sold under the brand name Nexium (or Neksium) among others, is a medication which reduces stomach acid. It is used to treat gastroesophageal reflux disease, peptic ulcer disease, and Zollinger–Ellison syndrome. Its effectiveness is similar to that of other proton pump inhibitors (PPIs). It is taken by mouth or injection into a vein.

Common side effects include headache, constipation, dry mouth, and abdominal pain. Serious side effects may include angioedema, Clostridioides difficile infection, and pneumonia. Use in pregnancy appears to be safe, while safety during breastfeeding is unclear. Esomeprazole is the (S)-(−)-enantiomer (or less specifically the S-isomer) of omeprazole. It works by blocking H^{+}/K^{+}-ATPase in the parietal cells of the stomach.

It was patented in 1993 and approved for medical use in 2000. It is available as a generic medication and sold over the counter in several countries. In 2023, it was the 147th most commonly prescribed medication in the United States, with more than 3 million prescriptions. In Australia, it was one of the top ten most-prescribed medications between 2017 and 2023. It is also available in lower dose formulations without a prescription in the United States, the United Kingdom as well as Australia, Canada, and New Zealand.

== Medical use ==
The primary uses of esomeprazole are gastroesophageal reflux disease, treatment and maintenance of erosive esophagitis, treatment of duodenal ulcers caused by H. pylori, prevention of gastric ulcers in those on chronic NSAID therapy, and treatment of gastrointestinal ulcers associated with Crohn's disease.

=== Gastroesophageal reflux disease ===
Gastroesophageal reflux disease (GERD) is a condition in which the digestive acid in the stomach comes in contact with the esophagus. The irritation caused by this disorder is known as heartburn. Long-term contact between gastric acids and the esophagus can cause permanent damage to the esophagus and is associated with Barrett's esophagus. Esomeprazole reduces the production of digestive acids, thus reducing their effect on the esophagus.

=== Duodenal ulcers ===
Esomeprazole is combined with the antibiotics clarithromycin and amoxicillin (or metronidazole instead of amoxicillin in penicillin-hypersensitive patients) in a 10-day eradication triple therapy for Helicobacter pylori. Infection by H. pylori is a causative factor in the majority of peptic and duodenal ulcers.

=== Efficacy ===
A 2006 meta analysis concluded that compared to other proton pump inhibitors, esomeprazole confers a modest overall benefit in esophageal healing and symptom relief. When broken down by disease severity, the benefit of esomeprazole relative to other proton pump inhibitors was negligible in people with mild disease (number needed to treat 50), but appeared more in those with severe disease (number needed to treat 8). A second meta analysis also found increases in erosive esophageal healing (>95% healing rate) when compared to standardized doses in broadly selected patient populations. A 2017 study found esomeprazole to be among a number of effective PPIs.

== Adverse effects ==
Common side effects include headache, diarrhea, nausea, flatulence, decreased appetite, constipation, dry mouth, and abdominal pain. More severe side effects are severe allergic reactions, chest pain, dark urine, fast heartbeat, fever, paresthesia, persistent sore throat, severe stomach pain, unusual bruising or bleeding, unusual tiredness, and yellowing of the eyes or skin.

Proton pump inhibitors may be associated with a greater risk of hip fractures and Clostridioides difficile-associated diarrhoea. Patients are frequently administered the drugs in intensive care as a protective measure against ulcers, but this use is also associated with a 30% increase in occurrence of pneumonia.

Long-term use of proton pump inhibitors in patients treated for Helicobacter pylori has been shown to dramatically increase the risk of gastric cancer.

Acute tubulointerstitial nephritis is a possible adverse reaction when using proton pump inhibitors.

== Interactions ==
Esomeprazole is a competitive inhibitor of the enzyme CYP2C19, and may therefore interact with drugs that depend on it for metabolism, such as diazepam and warfarin; the concentrations of these drugs may increase if they are used concomitantly with esomeprazole. Conversely, clopidogrel (Plavix) is an inactive prodrug that partially depends on CYP2C19 for conversion to its active form; inhibition of CYP2C19 blocks the activation of clopidogrel, thus reducing its effects.

Drugs that depend on stomach pH for absorption may interact with esomeprazole; drugs that depend on an acidic environment (such as ketoconazole or atazanavir) will be poorly absorbed, whereas drugs that are broken down in acidic environments (such as erythromycin) will be absorbed to a greater extent than normal.

== Pharmacokinetics ==
Single 20 to 40 mg oral doses generally give rise to peak plasma esomeprazole concentrations of 0.5-1.0 mg/L within 1–4 hours, but after several days of once-daily administration, these levels may increase by about 50%. A 30-minute intravenous infusion of a similar dose usually produces peak plasma levels on the order of 1–3 mg/L. The drug is rapidly cleared from the body, largely by urinary excretion of pharmacologically inactive metabolites such as 5-hydroxymethylesomeprazole and 5-carboxyesomeprazole. Esomeprazole and its metabolites are analytically indistinguishable from omeprazole and the corresponding omeprazole metabolites unless chiral techniques are employed.

== Dosage forms ==
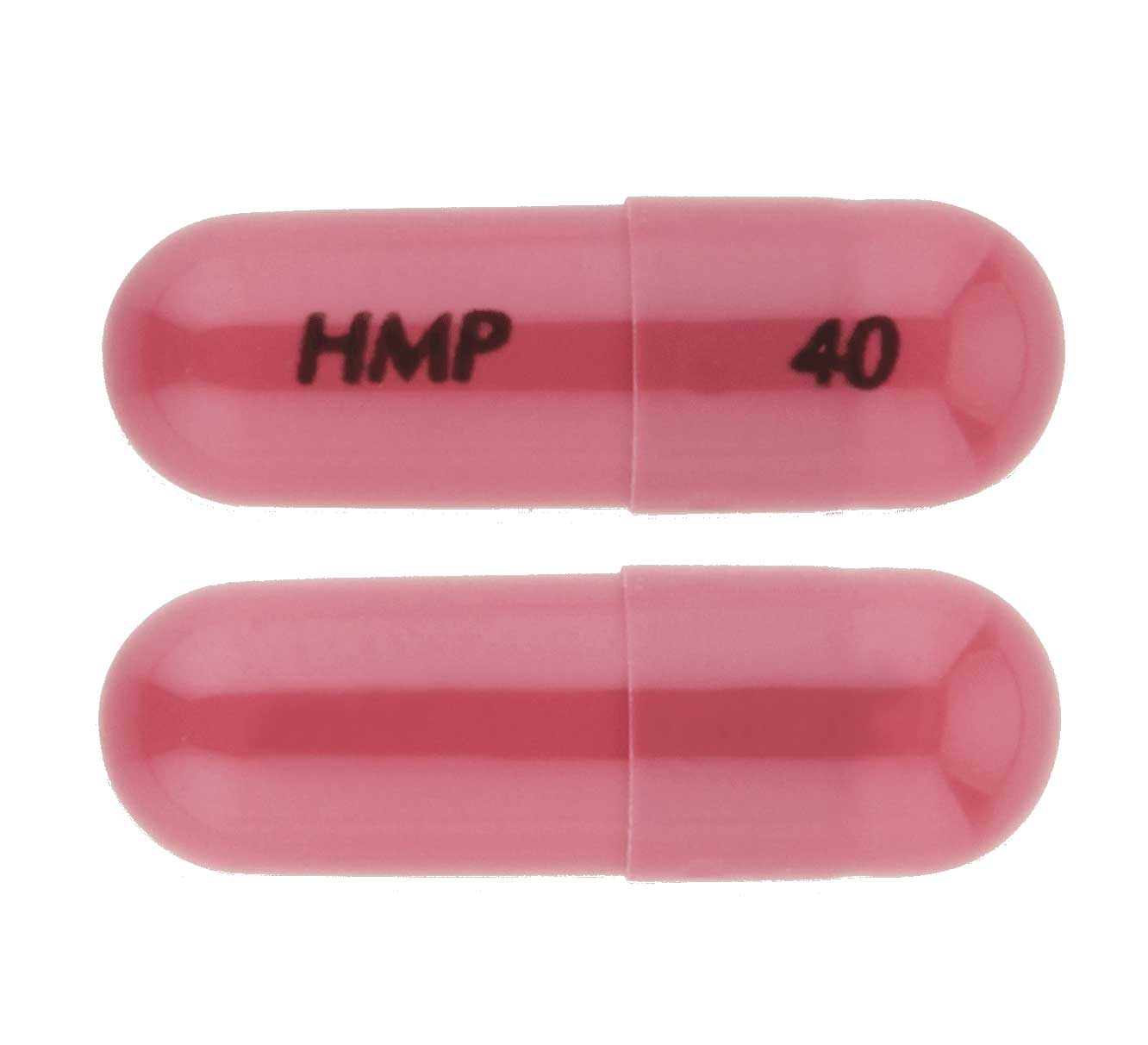
Esomeprazole strontium delayed-release capsules, 49.3 mg

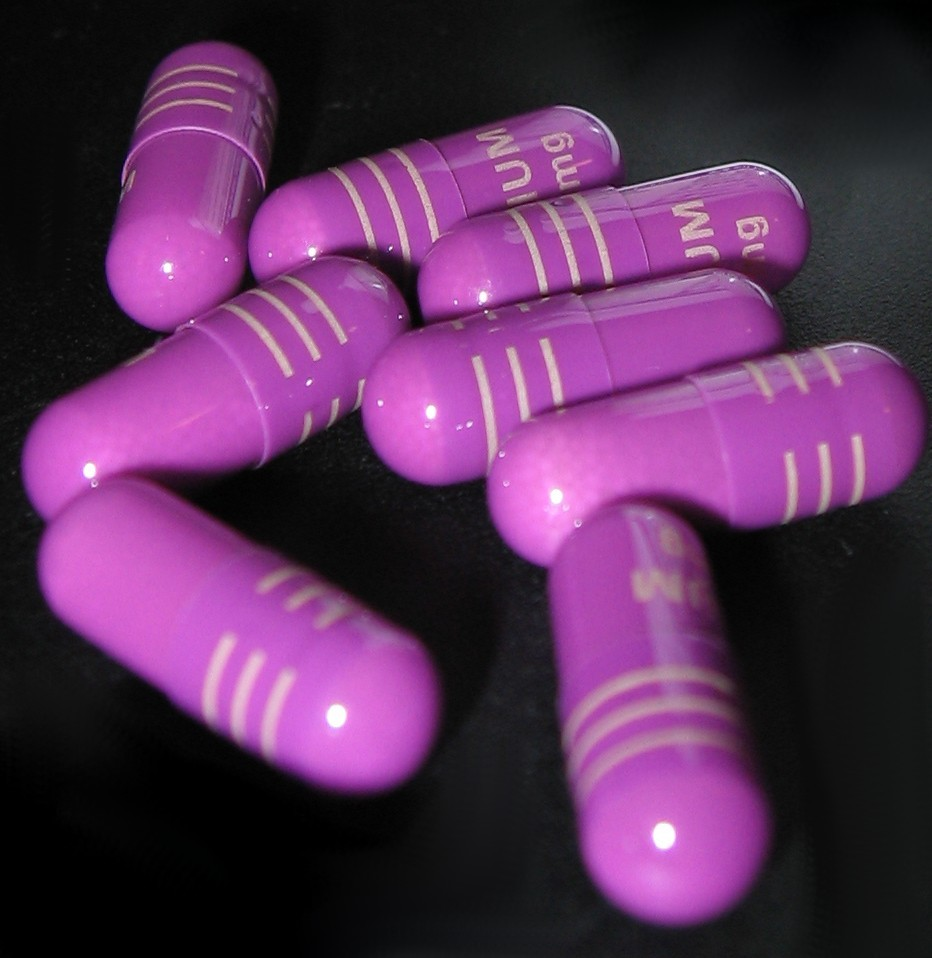
40 mg Nexium (esomeprazole magnesium) capsules

Esomeprazole is available as delayed-release capsules in the United States or as delayed-release tablets in Australia, the United Kingdom, and Canada (containing esomeprazole magnesium) in strengths of 20 and 40 mg, as delayed-release capsules in the United States (containing esomeprazole strontium) in a 49.3 mg strength (delivering the equivalent of 40 mg of esomeprazole, and as esomeprazole sodium for intravenous injection/infusion. Oral esomeprazole preparations are enteric-coated, due to the rapid degradation of the drug in the acidic conditions of the stomach. This is achieved by formulating capsules using the multiple-unit pellet system.

The combination naproxen/esomeprazole magnesium (brand name Vimovo) is used for the prevention of gastric ulcers associated with chronic NSAID therapy. Vimovo is available in two dosage strengths: 500/20 mg and 375/20 mg. Clinical trials of naproxen/esomeprazole demonstrated an incidence of GI ulcer in 24% of patients on naproxen (alone) versus 7% on naproxen/esomeprazole. The FDA has added warnings to the label for Vimovo concerning acute interstitial nephritis and risk of kidney problems in some patients.

=== Multiple-unit pellet system ===
Esomeprazole capsules, as well as Losec/Prilosec tablets, are formulated as a "multiple-unit pellet system" (MUPS). Essentially, the capsule consists of extremely small enteric-coated granules (pellets) of the esomeprazole formulation inside an outer shell. When the capsule is immersed in an aqueous solution, as happens when the capsule reaches the stomach, water enters the capsule by osmosis. The contents swell from water absorption, causing the shell to burst, and releasing the enteric-coated granules. For most patients, the multiple-unit pellet system is of no advantage over conventional enteric-coated preparations. Patients for whom the formulation is of benefit include those requiring nasogastric tube feeding and those with difficulty swallowing (dysphagia).

== Society and culture ==
=== Global distribution ===
In 2010, AstraZeneca announced a co-promotion agreement with Daiichi Sankyo to distribute Nexium in Japan. In September 2011, Nexium was approved for sale and was launched by Daiichi Sankyo in Japan. Esomeprazole was approved for use in the United States in February 2001.

=== Economics ===
Between the launch of esomeprazole in 2001 and 2005, the drug netted AstraZeneca about $14.4 billion.

=== Controversy ===
There has been some controversy about AstraZeneca's behaviour in creating, patenting, and marketing the drug. Esomeprazole's successful predecessor, omeprazole, is a mixture of two mirror-imaged molecules (esomeprazole which is the S-enantiomer, and R-omeprazole); critics said the company was trying to "evergreen" its omeprazole patent by patenting the pure esomeprazole and aggressively marketing to doctors that it is more effective than the mixture.

=== Brand names ===
Generic versions of esomeprazole magnesium are available worldwide. It is available over-the-counter under the brand name Nexium in the United States and the UK.

=== Veterinary use ===
Injection formulations of esomeprazole are used for gastroprotection in veterinary medicine. In goats administered the drug by intravenous or subcutaneous injection rapid elimination was noted. In that study the sulfone metabolite was detectable for several hours after injection of the parent drug.

== Other uses ==
Esomeprazole can be used as a parasiticide. Gokmen et al., 2016 screen for efficacy against Trichomonas vaginalis isolates from horses. They found esomeprazole to be effective as a veterinary antiparasitic.
