= Acetoxyacetylaminofluorene =

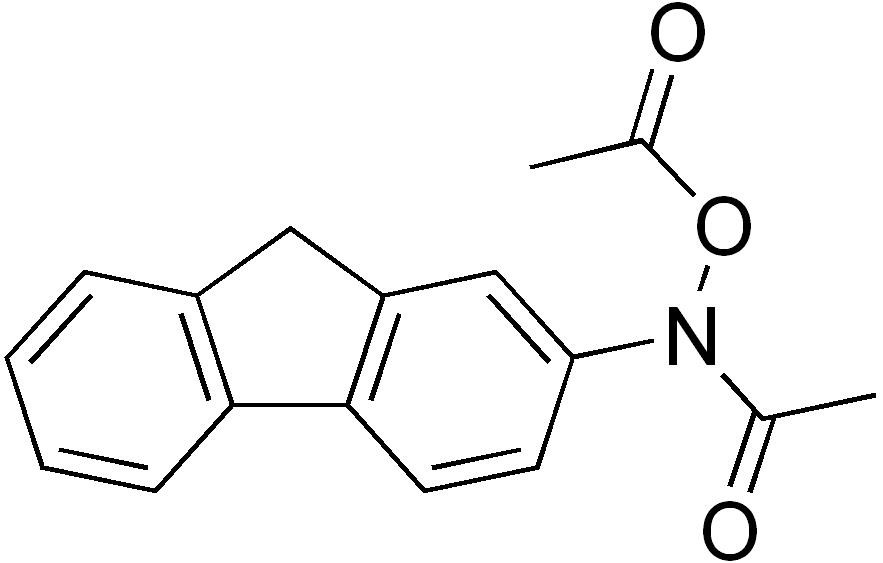

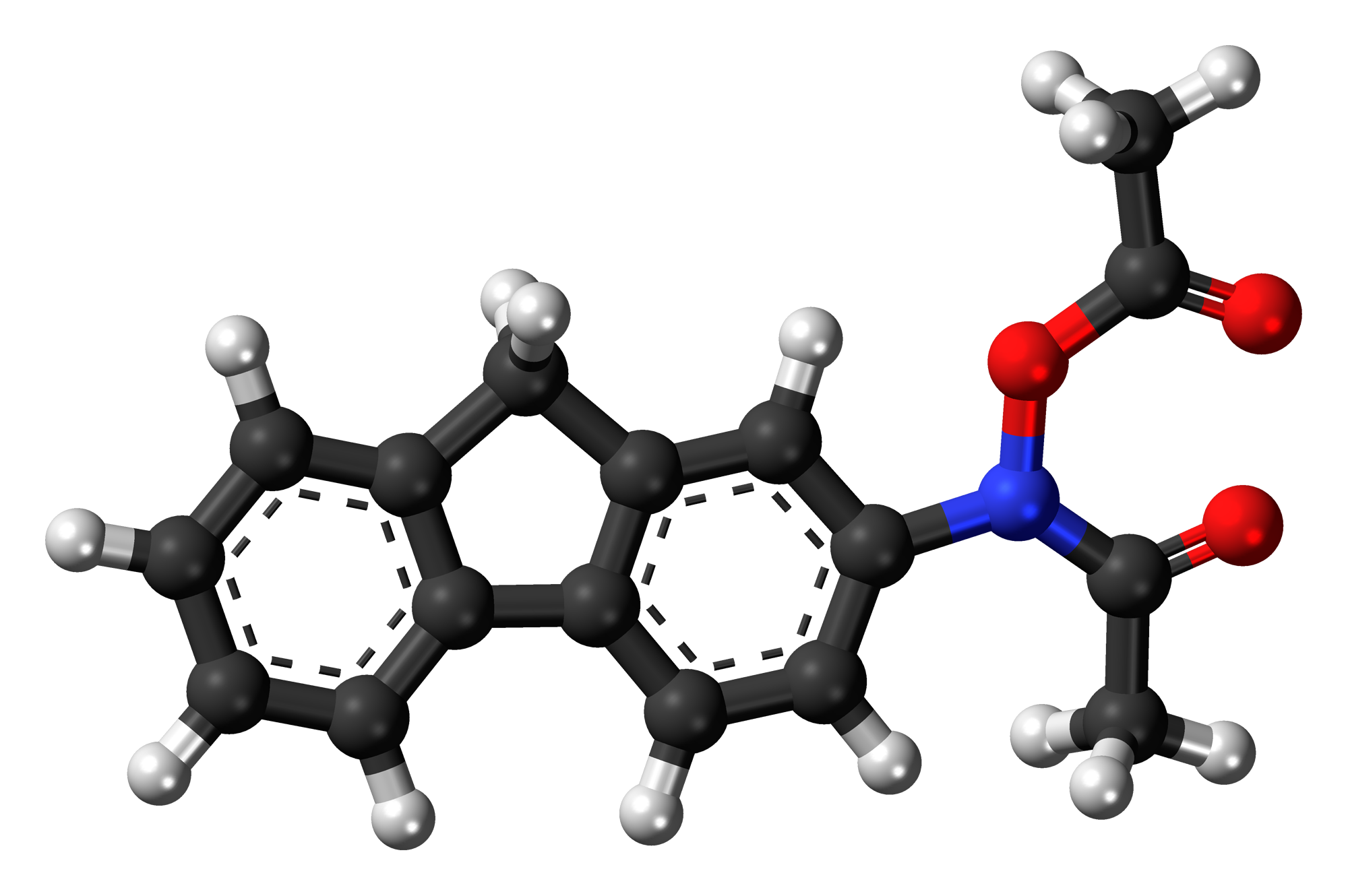

Names
- Preferred IUPAC name N-(Acetyloxy)-N-(9H-fluoren-2-yl)acetamide
- Other names N-Acetoxy-N-(9H-fluoren-2-yl)acetamide; N-Acetoxy-2-acetamidofluorene; N-Acetoxy-2-acetylaminofluorene; Acetoxyacetamidofluorene; Acetoxyfluorenylacetamide

Identifiers
CAS Number	6098-44-8
3D model (JSmol)	Interactive image; Interactive image
Abbreviations	NAAAF
ChEBI	CHEBI:234426
ChEMBL	ChEMBL85327
ChemSpider	21074
MeSH	Acetoxyacetylaminofluorene
PubChem CID	22469
UNII	Q3EAS7L4RW
CompTox Dashboard (EPA)	DTXSID90209828
- InChI: InChI=1S/C17H15NO3/c1-11(19)18(21-12(2)20)15-7-8-17-14(10-15)9-13-5-3-4-6-16(13)17/h3-8,10H,9H2,1-2H3 Key: NFOMHWALMFWNAQ-UHFFFAOYSA-N; InChI=1/C17H15NO3/c1-11(19)18(21-12(2)20)15-7-8-17-14(10-15)9-13-5-3-4-6-16(13)17/h3-8,10H,9H2,1-2H3 Key: NFOMHWALMFWNAQ-UHFFFAOYAD
- SMILES: CC(=O)ON(C(C)=O)c1ccc-2c(Cc3ccccc-23)c1; CC(=O)ON(C(C)=O)C1=CC=C2C(CC3=C2C=CC=C3)=C1

Properties
Chemical formula	C_{17}H_{15}NO_{3}
Molar mass	281.311 g·mol^{−1}
log P	3.327
- Except where otherwise noted, data are given for materials in their standard state (at 25 °C [77 °F], 100 kPa). verify (what is ?) Infobox references

Acetoxyacetylaminofluorene is a derivative of 2-acetylaminofluorene used as a biochemical tool in the study of carcinogenesis. It forms adducts with DNA by reacting with guanine at its C-8 position.; This results in breaks in one strand of the DNA.

== See also ==
- Hydroxyacetylaminofluorene
