= Karin Briner =

Medicinal chemist

Karin Briner, Ph.D.
- Scientific career
- Doctoral advisor: Andrea Vasella
- Other academic advisors: William Roush

Karin Briner is a medicinal chemist and pharmaceutical executive currently employed as Senior Vice President, Head of Drug Discovery at Genentech.

== Education ==
Briner received her B.S. and Ph.D. degrees working at the University of Zurich with Professor Andrea Vasella. She pursued postdoctoral studies at Indiana University with Prof. William Roush, developing new methods to stereoselectively synthesize natural product glycosides.

== Career ==
After completing postdoctoral studies, Briner was hired at Eli Lilly & Company as a Senior Chemist in Infectious Diseases. Her work eventually evolved into central nervous system disorders such as depression, evidenced by multiple selective compounds against various serotonin receptors. She became the Managing Director of the Lilly Research Centre, UK, from 2007–2010. Briner was hired by the Novartis Institutes for Biomedical Research as the Global Head of Chemistry in 2011. Since that time, her team has been involved in the development of multiple new drug launches, for example nilotinib, ceritinib, panobinostat, and Entresto. Briner left Novartis in late 2022, and is currently Senior Vice President, Head of Drug Discovery at Genentech.

== Volunteer service ==
Briner was a founding member of the Innovative Medicines Initiative (IMI), and remains active in professional societies such as the European Federation for Medicinal Chemistry and the American Chemical Society. She has delivered plenary talks at multiple scientific meetings. She was active in a mentoring capacity to incoming postdoctoral and Summer scholars at Novartis.

Briner maintains an entry for the chemical production and purification of elemental lithium at EROS.
