= Noroliveroline =

Names
- IUPAC name 2′H-12-Nor[1,3]dioxolo[4′,5′:1,2]-6aβ-aporphin-7β-ol
- Systematic IUPAC name (7aS,8S)-6,7,7a,8-Tetrahydro-2H,5H-benzo[g][1,3]benzodioxolo[6,5,4-de]quinolin-8-ol

Identifiers
CAS Number	83730-14-7
3D model (JSmol)	Interactive image
ChEMBL	ChEMBL464657
ChemSpider	139487
KEGG	C16997
PubChem CID	158566
UNII	97CWM52SAJ
CompTox Dashboard (EPA)	DTXSID301003743
- InChI: InChI=1S/C17H15NO3/c19-16-11-4-2-1-3-10(11)14-13-9(5-6-18-15(13)16)7-12-17(14)21-8-20-12/h1-4,7,15-16,18-19H,5-6,8H2/t15-,16-/m0/s1 Key: CKIYSMRPIBQTHQ-HOTGVXAUSA-N; InChI=1/C17H15NO3/c19-16-11-4-2-1-3-10(11)14-13-9(5-6-18-15(13)16)7-12-17(14)21-8-20-12/h1-4,7,15-16,18-19H,5-6,8H2/t15-,16-/m0/s1 Key: CKIYSMRPIBQTHQ-HOTGVXAUBH
- SMILES: C1CN[C@@H]2[C@H](C3=CC=CC=C3C4=C2C1=CC5=C4OCO5)O

Properties
Chemical formula	C_{17}H_{15}NO_{3}
Molar mass	281.311 g·mol^{−1}

Related compounds
Related compounds	Michelalbine, R-(-)-norushinsunine
- Except where otherwise noted, data are given for materials in their standard state (at 25 °C [77 °F], 100 kPa). Infobox references

Noroliveroline is an anticholinergic alkaloid.
