= 2-Acetylaminofluorene =

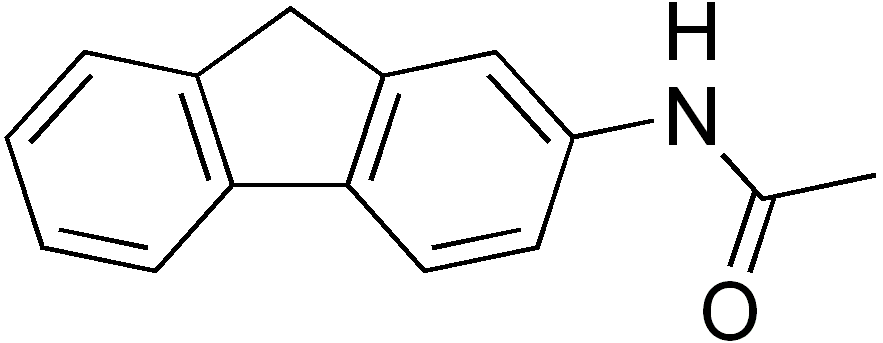
- Kekulé, skeletal formula of 2-acetylaminofluorene

Names
- Preferred IUPAC name N-(9H-Fluoren-2-yl)acetamide
- Other names 2-Acetaminofluorene N-2-Fluorenylacetamide N-Acetyl-2-aminofluorene

Identifiers
CAS Number	53-96-3
3D model (JSmol)	Interactive image; Interactive image
Abbreviations	2-AAF
Beilstein Reference	2807677
ChEBI	CHEBI:17356
ChEMBL	ChEMBL311469
ChemSpider	5686
ECHA InfoCard	100.000.172
EC Number	200-188-6
KEGG	C02778
MeSH	2-Acetylaminofluorene
PubChem CID	5897
RTECS number	AB9450000
UNII	9M98QLJ2DL
UN number	3077
CompTox Dashboard (EPA)	DTXSID0039227
- InChI: InChI=1S/C15H13NO/c1-10(17)16-13-6-7-15-12(9-13)8-11-4-2-3-5-14(11)15/h2-7,9H,8H2,1H3,(H,16,17) Key: CZIHNRWJTSTCEX-UHFFFAOYSA-N; InChI=1/C15H13NO/c1-10(17)16-13-6-7-15-12(9-13)8-11-4-2-3-5-14(11)15/h2-7,9H,8H2,1H3,(H,16,17) Key: CZIHNRWJTSTCEX-UHFFFAOYAF
- SMILES: CC(=O)Nc1ccc2c(Cc3ccccc23)c1; CC(=O)NC1=CC=C2C(CC3=C2C=CC=C3)=C1

Properties
Chemical formula	C_{15}H_{13}NO
Molar mass	223.275 g·mol^{−1}
Appearance	Vivid, light brown, opaque crystals
Melting point	192 to 196 °C (378 to 385 °F; 465 to 469 K)
log P	3.264

Hazards
- Occupational safety and health (OHS/OSH)
Main hazards	potential occupational carcinogen
- GHS labelling
Pictograms	(GHS07: Exclamation mark) (GHS08: Health hazard)
Signal word	Danger
Hazard statements	H302, H350
Precautionary statements	P201, P308+P313
- NIOSH (US health exposure limits)
PEL (Permissible)	[OSHA-Regulated Carcinogen]
- Except where otherwise noted, data are given for materials in their standard state (at 25 °C [77 °F], 100 kPa). verify (what is ?) Infobox references

2-Acetylaminofluorene (AAF, 2-AAF) is a carcinogenic and mutagenic derivative of fluorene. It is used as a biochemical tool in the study of carcinogenesis. It induces tumors in a number of species in the liver, bladder and kidney. The metabolism of this compound in the body by means of biotransformation reactions is the key to its carcinogenicity. 2-AAF is a substrate for cytochrome P-450 (CYP) enzyme, which is a part of a super family found in almost all organisms. This reaction results in the formation of hydroxyacetylaminofluorene which is a proximal carcinogen and is more potent than the parent molecule. The N-hydroxy metabolite undergoes several enzymatic and non-enzymatic rearrangements. It can be O-acetylated by cytosolic N-acetyltransferase enzyme to yield N-acetyl-N-acetoxyaminofluorene. This intermediate can spontaneously rearrange to form the arylamidonium ion and a carbonium ion which can interact directly with DNA to produce DNA adducts. In addition to esterification by acetylation, the N-hydroxy derivative can be O-sulfated by cytosolic sulfur transferase enzyme giving rise to the N-acetyl-N-sulfoxy product.

In addition, the cytosolic N,O-aryl hydroxamic acid acyltransferase enzyme catalyzes the transfer of the acetyl group from the N atom of the N-OH-2-AAF to the O atom of the N-OH group to produce N-acetoxy-2-aminofluorene (N-OH-2-AF). This reactive metabolite spontaneously decomposes to form a nitrenium ion which will also react with DNA. However, the product of this latter reaction is the deacetylated aminofluorene adduct. The interconversion of amide and amine metabolites of 2-AAF can further occur via the microsomal enzyme deacetylase producing the N-hydroxy metabolite of the amine derivative. Subsequent esterification of the aryl hydroxylamine by sulfur transferase yields the sulfate ester which also spontaneously decompose to form nitrenium ion. The reactive nitrenium, carbonium and arylamidonium ion metabolites of 2-AAF react with the nucleophilic groups in DNA, proteins and endogenous thiols such as glutathione. Other metabolites such as the N,O-glucuronide, although not directly activated products, can be important in the carcinogenic process because they are capable of degradation to proximal N-hydroxy metabolites. This metabolite is presumed to be involved in formation of bladder tumors. The mechanism for this is thought to involve degradation of glucuronide in the bladder due to acidic pH of urine.

== See also ==
- Acetoxyacetylaminofluorene
- Hydroxyacetylaminofluorene
