= Suprofen =

Non-steroidal anti-inflammatory drug

Clinical data
- AHFS/Drugs.com: Micromedex Detailed Consumer Information
- Routes of administration: Oral, eye drops
- ATC code: M01AE07 (WHO)

Legal status
- Legal status: Discontinued

Pharmacokinetic data
- Protein binding: 20%

Identifiers
- IUPAC name: (RS)-2-[4-(2-thienylcarbonyl)phenyl]propanoic acid
- CAS Number: 40828-46-4
- PubChem CID: 5359
- IUPHAR/BPS: 7298
- DrugBank: DB00870
- ChemSpider: 5166
- UNII: 988GU2F9PE
- KEGG: D00452
- ChEBI: CHEBI:9362
- ChEMBL: ChEMBL956
- CompTox Dashboard (EPA): DTXSID5045469
- ECHA InfoCard: 100.050.071

Chemical and physical data
- Formula: C_{14}H_{12}O_{3}S
- Molar mass: 260.31 g·mol^{−1}
- 3D model (JSmol): Interactive image
- SMILES: O=C(c1ccc(cc1)C(C(=O)O)C)c2sccc2
- InChI: InChI=1S/C14H12O3S/c1-9(14(16)17)10-4-6-11(7-5-10)13(15)12-3-2-8-18-12/h2-9H,1H3,(H,16,17); Key:MDKGKXOCJGEUJW-UHFFFAOYSA-N

Suprofen is a nonsteroidal anti-inflammatory drug (NSAID) developed by Janssen Pharmaceutica that was marketed as 1% eye drops under the trade name Profenal.

== Uses ==
Suprofen was originally used as tablet, but oral uses have been discontinued due to renal effects. It was subsequently used exclusively as a topical ophthalmic solution, typically to prevent miosis during and after ophthalmic surgery. This application has been discontinued as well, at least in the US.
