= Naproxen =

Nonsteroidal anti-inflammatory drug (NSAID) used to treat pain

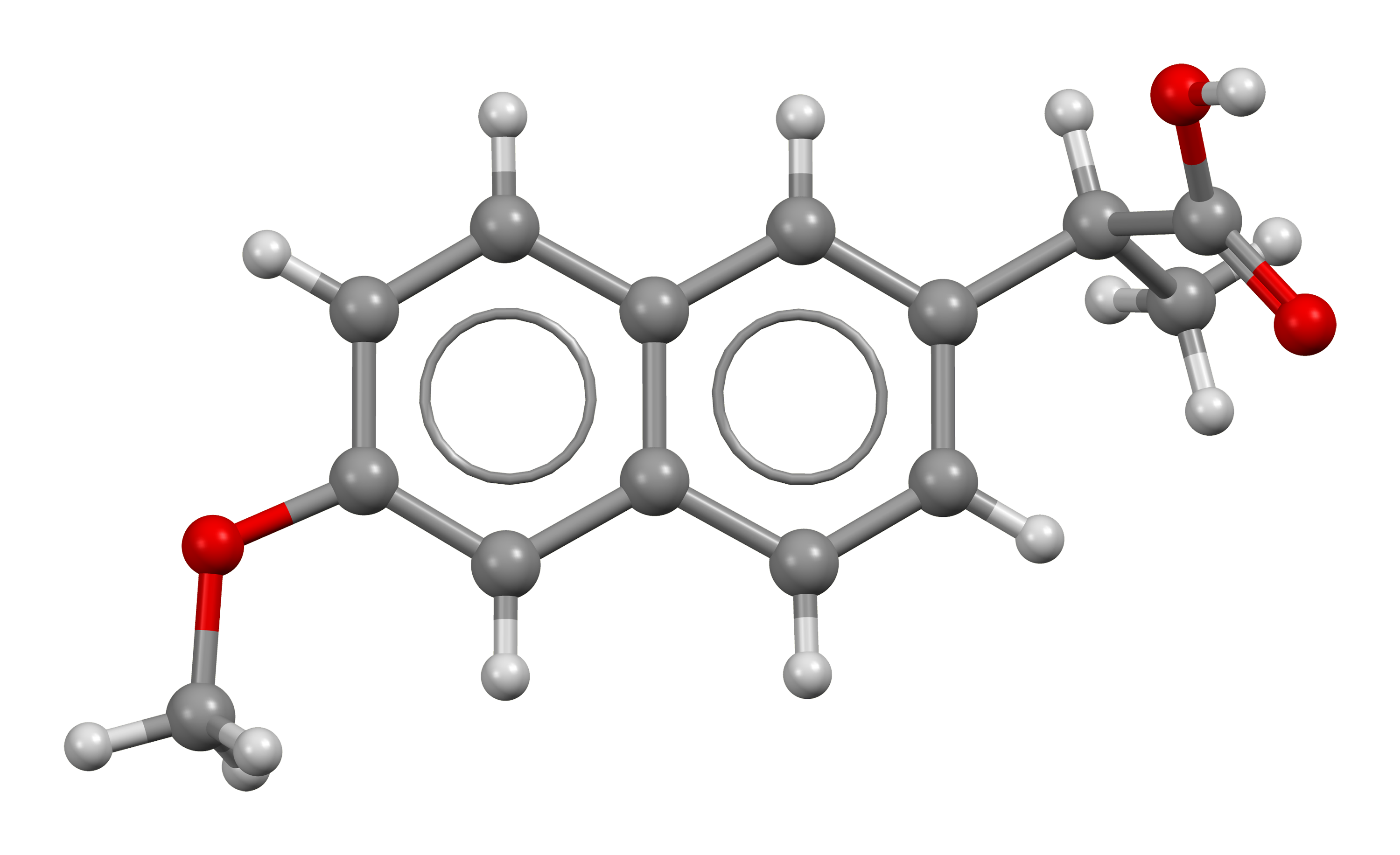

Clinical data
- Pronunciation: /nəˈprɒksən/
- Trade names: Aleve, Naprosyn, others
- AHFS/Drugs.com: Monograph
- MedlinePlus: a681029
- License data: US DailyMed: Naproxen
- Pregnancy category: AU: C
- Routes of administration: By mouth
- ATC code: G02CC02 (WHO) M01AE02 (WHO), M02AA12 (WHO), M01AE56 (WHO), M01AE52 (WHO)

Legal status
- Legal status: AU: S2 (Pharmacy medicine) when in preparations that contain no more than 15 days' supply. Otherwise it is Schedule 4 (Prescription only).; CA: OTC / Rx-only; UK: POM (Prescription only) / P; US: OTC / Rx-only

Pharmacokinetic data
- Bioavailability: 100% (by mouth)
- Protein binding: 99%
- Metabolism: Liver (to 6-desmethylnaproxen)
- Onset of action: 1 hour
- Elimination half-life: 14 hours (adults)
- Duration of action: 12 hours
- Excretion: Kidney

Identifiers
- IUPAC name: (+)-(S)-2-(6-Methoxynaphthalen-2-yl)propanoic acid
- CAS Number: 22204-53-1
- PubChem CID: 156391
- DrugBank: DB00788
- ChemSpider: 137720
- UNII: 57Y76R9ATQ
- KEGG: D00118; as salt: D00970
- ChEBI: CHEBI:7476
- ChEMBL: ChEMBL154
- PDB ligand: NPX (PDBe, RCSB PDB)
- CompTox Dashboard (EPA): DTXSID4040686
- ECHA InfoCard: 100.040.747

Chemical and physical data
- Formula: C_{14}H_{14}O_{3}
- Molar mass: 230.263 g·mol^{−1}
- 3D model (JSmol): Interactive image
- Melting point: 152–154 °C (306–309 °F)
- SMILES: COc1cc2ccc(cc2cc1)[C@@H](C)C(=O)O
- InChI: InChI=1S/C14H14O3/c1-9(14(15)16)10-3-4-12-8-13(17-2)6-5-11(12)7-10/h3-9H,1-2H3,(H,15,16)/t9-/m0/s1; Key:CMWTZPSULFXXJA-VIFPVBQESA-N

Naproxen, sold under the brand name Aleve among others, is a nonsteroidal anti-inflammatory drug (NSAID) used to treat pain, menstrual cramps, and inflammatory diseases such as rheumatoid arthritis, gout and fever. It is taken orally. It is available in immediate and delayed release formulations. Onset of effects is within an hour and lasts for up to twelve hours. Naproxen is also available in salt form, naproxen sodium, which has better solubility when taken orally.

Common side effects include dizziness, headache, bruising, allergic reactions, heartburn, and stomach pain. Severe side effects include an increased risk of heart disease, stroke, gastrointestinal bleeding, and stomach ulcers. The heart disease risk may be lower than with other NSAIDs. It is not recommended in people with kidney problems. Use is not recommended in the third trimester of pregnancy.

Naproxen is a nonselective COX inhibitor. As an NSAID, naproxen appears to exert its anti-inflammatory action by reducing the production of inflammatory mediators called prostaglandins. It is metabolized by the liver to inactive metabolites.

Naproxen was patented in 1967 and approved for medical use in the United States in 1976. In the United States it is available over-the-counter and as a generic medication. In 2023, it was the 103rd most commonly prescribed medication in the United States, with more than 6 million prescriptions. Naproxen is a therapeutic alternative on the World Health Organization's List of Essential Medicines.

== Medical uses ==
Naproxen's medical uses are related to its mechanism of action as an anti-inflammatory compound. Naproxen is used to treat a variety of inflammatory conditions and symptoms that are due to excessive inflammation, such as pain and fever (naproxen has fever-reducing, or antipyretic, properties in addition to its anti-inflammatory activity). Naproxen's anti-inflammatory properties relieve pain caused by inflammatory conditions such as migraine, osteoarthritis, kidney stones, rheumatoid arthritis, psoriatic arthritis, gout, ankylosing spondylitis, menstrual cramps, tendinitis, and bursitis. Naproxen has also proven effective for acute post-operative pain.

Naproxen sodium is used as a "bridge therapy" in medication-overuse headache to slowly take patients off other medications.

=== Available formulations ===
Naproxen sodium is available as both an immediate-release and an extended-release tablet. The extended-release formulations (sometimes called "sustained release", or "enteric coated") take longer to take effect than the immediate-release formulations and therefore are less useful when immediate pain relief is desired. Extended-release formulations are more useful for the treatment of chronic, or long-lasting, conditions, in which long-term pain relief is desirable.

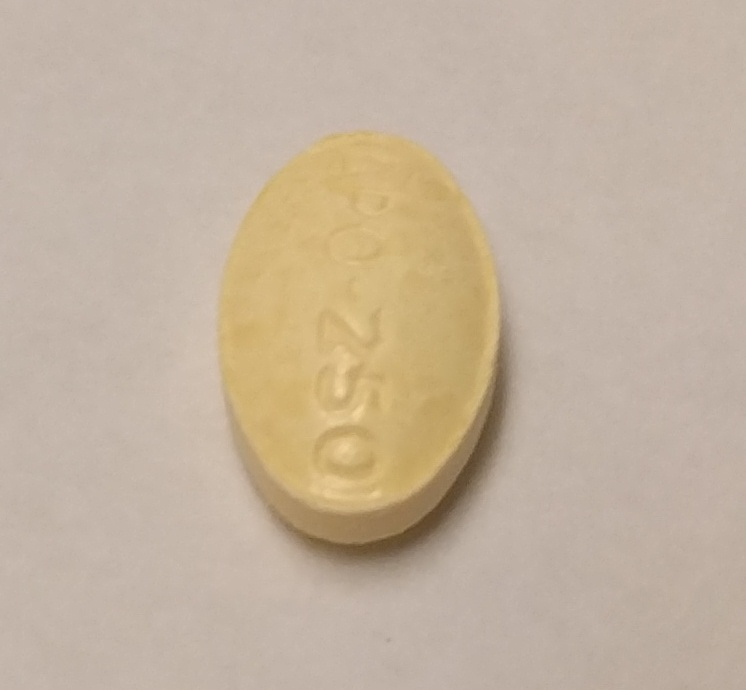
250 mg tablet of naproxen

220 mg tablet of naproxen sodium. Imprint L490. Round, light blue tablet

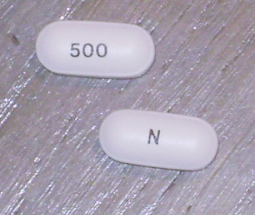
Naproxen extended release 500 mg, back and front

=== Pregnancy and lactation ===
As with all non-steroidal anti-inflammatory medications (NSAIDs), naproxen use should be avoided in pregnancy due to the importance of prostaglandins in vascular and renal function in the fetus. NSAIDs should especially be avoided in the third trimester. Small amounts of naproxen are excreted in breast milk. However, adverse effects are uncommon in infants breastfed from a mother taking naproxen.

== Adverse effects ==
Common adverse effects include dizziness, drowsiness, headache, rash, bruising, and gastrointestinal upset. Heavy use is associated with an increased risk of end-stage renal disease and kidney failure. Naproxen may cause muscle cramps in the legs in 3% of people.

In October 2020, the U.S. Food and Drug Administration (FDA) required the prescribing information to be updated for all nonsteroidal anti-inflammatory medications to describe the risk of kidney problems in unborn babies that result in low amniotic fluid. They recommend avoiding NSAIDs in pregnant women at 20 weeks or later in pregnancy.

=== Gastrointestinal ===
As with other non-COX-2 selective NSAIDs, naproxen can cause gastrointestinal problems, such as heartburn, constipation, diarrhea, ulcers and stomach bleeding. Naproxen should be taken orally with, or just after food, to decrease the risk of gastrointestinal side effects. Persons with a history of ulcers or inflammatory bowel disease should consult a doctor before taking naproxen. In U.S. markets, naproxen is sold with boxed warnings about the risk of gastrointestinal ulceration or bleeding. Naproxen poses an intermediate risk of stomach ulcers compared with ibuprofen, which is low-risk, and indometacin, which is high-risk. To reduce stomach ulceration risk, it is often combined with a proton-pump inhibitor (a medication that reduces stomach acid production) during long-term treatment of those with pre-existing stomach ulcers or a history of developing stomach ulcers while on NSAIDs.

=== Cardiovascular ===
COX-2 selective and nonselective NSAIDs have been linked to increases in the number of serious and potentially fatal cardiovascular events, such as myocardial infarctions and strokes. Naproxen is, however, associated with the smallest overall cardiovascular risks. Cardiovascular risk must be considered when prescribing any nonsteroidal anti-inflammatory drug. The drug had roughly 50% of the associated risk of stroke compared with ibuprofen and was also associated with a reduced number of myocardial infarctions compared with control groups.

A study found that high-dose naproxen induced near-complete suppression of platelet thromboxane throughout the dosing interval and appeared not to increase cardiovascular disease (CVD) risk, whereas other non-aspirin high-dose NSAID regimens had only transient effects on platelet COX-1 and were associated with a small but definite vascular hazard. Conversely, naproxen was associated with higher rates of upper gastrointestinal bleeding complications compared with other NSAIDs.

== Drug-drug interactions ==
Naproxen may interact with antidepressants, lithium, methotrexate, probenecid, warfarin and other blood thinners, heart or blood pressure medications, including diuretics, or steroid medicines such as prednisone.

NSAIDs such as naproxen may interfere with and reduce the efficacy of SSRI antidepressants, as well as increase the risk of bleeding greater than the individual bleeding risk of either class of agent, when taken together. Naproxen is not contraindicated in the presence of SSRIs, though concomitant use of the medications should be done with caution. Alcohol consumption increases the risk of gastrointestinal bleeding when combined with NSAIDs like naproxen in a dose-dependent manner (that is, the higher the dose of naproxen, the higher the risk of bleeding). The risk is highest for people who are heavy drinkers.

== Pharmacology ==
=== Mechanism of action ===
Naproxen works by reversibly inhibiting both the COX-1 and COX-2 enzymes as a non-selective NSAID.

=== Pharmacokinetics ===
Naproxen is a minor substrate of CYP1A2 and CYP2C9. It is extensively metabolized in the liver to 6-O-desmethylnaproxen, and both the parent drug and the desmethyl metabolite undergo further metabolism to their respective acylglucuronide conjugated metabolites. An analysis of two clinical trials shows that naproxen's time to peak plasma concentration occurs between 2 and 4 hours after oral administration (the naproxen sodium formulation of the medication reaches peak plasma concentrations within 1–2 hours).

=== Pharmacogenetics ===
The pharmacogenetics of naproxen has been studied to better understand its adverse effects. In 1998, a small pharmacokinetic (PK) study failed to show that differences in a patient's ability to clear naproxen from the body could account for differences in a patient's risk of experiencing the adverse effect of a serious gastrointestinal bleed while taking naproxen. However, the study failed to account for differences in the activity of CYP2C9, a drug-metabolizing enzyme that is necessary for clearing naproxen. Studies on the relationship between CYP2C9 genotype and NSAID-induced gastrointestinal bleeds have shown that genetic variants in CYP2C9 that reduce the clearance of major CYP2C9 substrates (like naproxen) increase the risk of NSAID-induced gastrointestinal bleeds, especially for homozygous defective variants.

== Chemistry ==
Naproxen is a member of the 2-arylpropionic acid (profen) family of NSAIDs. The free acid is an odorless, white to off-white crystalline substance. Naproxen free base is lipid-soluble and practically insoluble in water, while naproxen sodium and many other salts are freely soluble in water, often soluble in methanol, and sparingly soluble in alcohol; check the specific solubility of each salt before use. Naproxen has a melting point of 152–155 °C, while naproxen salts tend to have higher melting points.

=== Synthesis ===
Naproxen has been industrially produced by Syntex starting from 2-naphthol as follows:

Synthesis of naproxen

== Society and culture ==
=== Brand names ===
Naproxen and naproxen sodium are marketed under various brand names, including Accord, Aleve, Anaprox, Antalgin, Apranax, Eox, Feminax Ultra, Flanax, Inza, Maxidol, Nalgesin, Naposin, Naprelan, Naprogesic, Naprosyn, Narocin, Pronaxen, Proxen, Soproxen, and Xenifar. It is also available as the combination naproxen/esomeprazole magnesium in delayed-release tablets under the brand name Vimovo.

=== Access restrictions ===
Syntex first marketed naproxen in 1976, as the prescription drug Naprosyn. They first marketed naproxen sodium under the brand name Anaprox in 1980. It remains a prescription-only drug in much of the world. In the United States, the Food and Drug Administration (FDA) approved it as an over-the-counter (OTC) drug in 1994. OTC preparations of naproxen in the U.S. are mainly marketed by Bayer HealthCare, under the brand name Aleve, and as generic store brand formulations, in 220 mg tablets. In Australia, packets of 275 mg tablets of naproxen sodium are Schedule 2 pharmacy medicines, with a maximum daily dose of five tablets or 1375 mg. In the United Kingdom, 250 mg tablets of naproxen were approved for OTC sale under the brand name Feminax Ultra in 2008, for the treatment of primary dysmenorrhoea in women aged 15 to 50. In the Netherlands, 220 mg and 275 mg tablets are available OTC in drugstores, 550 mg is OTC only at pharmacies. Aleve became available over the counter in some provinces in Canada on 14 July 2009, but not British Columbia, Quebec or Newfoundland and Labrador; it subsequently became available OTC in British Columbia in January 2010 and Quebec in 2023.

== Ecological effects ==
Naproxen has been found in groundwater and drinking water in concentrations high enough to have adverse effects on invertebrates, fungi, algae, bacteria and fishes. Naproxen is not thoroughly removed by conventional water treatment methods, and its degradation pathways in the environment are limited. Some methods more successfully remove naproxen from wastewater, including metal–organic complexes and porous carbon. Although the levels are generally low enough to not be acutely toxic, sub-lethal effects may still occur, such as reduced photosynthetic ability.

== Research ==
Naproxen may have antiviral activity against influenza. In laboratory research, it blocks the RNA-binding groove of the nucleoprotein of the virus, preventing the formation of the ribonucleoprotein complex—thus taking the viral nucleoproteins out of circulation.

== Veterinary use ==
=== Horses ===
Naproxen is given by mouth to horses at a dose of 10 mg/kg and has shown to have a wide safety margin (no toxicity when given at three times the recommended dose for 42 days). It is more effective for myositis than the commonly used NSAID phenylbutazone, and has shown especially good results for treatment of equine exertional rhabdomyolysis, a disease of muscle breakdown; it is less commonly used for musculoskeletal disease.
