= DS-1 (drug) =

Chemical compound

Identifiers
- IUPAC name: 4-chloro-N-(6,8-dibromo-2-thiophen-2-ylimidazo[1,2-a]pyridin-3-yl)benzamide
- CAS Number: 372497-52-4
- PubChem CID: 979735
- IUPHAR/BPS: 4183
- ChemSpider: 849261
- UNII: F8R2YWY4LXF
- CompTox Dashboard (EPA): DTXSID60359667
- ECHA InfoCard: 100.209.966

Chemical and physical data
- Formula: C_{18}H_{10}Br_{2}ClN_{3}OS
- Molar mass: 511.62 g·mol^{−1}
- 3D model (JSmol): Interactive image
- SMILES: s4cccc4-c2nc1c(Br)cc(Br)cn1c2NC(=O)c(cc3)ccc3Cl

DS-1 is a drug from the imidazopyridine family, which is the first drug developed that acts as a GABA_{A} receptor positive allosteric modulator (PAM) selective for the α4β3δ subtype, which is not targeted by other GABA_{A} receptor PAMs such as the benzodiazepines or other nonbenzodiazepine drugs. Novel selective drugs such as DS-1 are useful in the study of this receptor subtype.

== See also ==
- Alpidem
- Saripidem
- Zolpidem
