= Ocinaplon =

Chemical compound

Clinical data
- ATC code: none

Identifiers
- IUPAC name: pyridin-2-yl-(7-pyridin-4-ylpyrazolo[1,5-a]pyrimidin-3-yl)methanone
- CAS Number: 96604-21-6
- PubChem CID: 216456
- IUPHAR/BPS: 4277
- ChemSpider: 187602
- UNII: 2H6KVC5E76
- KEGG: D02617
- CompTox Dashboard (EPA): DTXSID00242362

Chemical and physical data
- Formula: C_{17}H_{11}N_{5}O
- Molar mass: 301.309 g·mol^{−1}
- 3D model (JSmol): Interactive image
- SMILES: O=C(c1cnn2c(ccnc12)c3ccncc3)c4ncccc4
- InChI: InChI=1S/C17H11N5O/c23-16(14-3-1-2-7-19-14)13-11-21-22-15(6-10-20-17(13)22)12-4-8-18-9-5-12/h1-11H; Key:OQJFBUOFGHPMSR-UHFFFAOYSA-N

Ocinaplon is an anxiolytic drug in the pyrazolopyrimidine family of drugs. Other pyrazolopyrimidine drugs include zaleplon and indiplon.

Ocinaplon has a similar pharmacological profile to the benzodiazepine family of drugs, but with mainly anxiolytic properties and relatively little sedative or amnestic effect.

== Medical uses ==
A 2019 review found tentative evidence of benefit in anxiety.

== Mechanism of action ==
The mechanism of action by which ocinaplon produces its anxiolytic effects is by modulating GABA_{A} receptors, although ocinaplon is more subtype-selective than most benzodiazepines.

== Availability ==
Development of ocinaplon is discontinued due to liver complications that occurred in one of the Phase III subjects.

== Synthesis ==
Ocinaplon synthesis: U.S. patent 4,521,422 Further reading:

Condensation of 4-Acetylpyridine with N,N-Dimethylformamide dimethyl acetal (DMFDMA) gives the "enamide" (3). This is then condensed with (3-Amino-1H-pyrazol-4-yl)(2-pyridinyl)methanone (4) (96219-90-8). This is the same intermediate as was used in the synthesis of zaleplon in which the nitrile is replaced by a 2-acetylpyridil moiety. This affords the anxiolytic agent ocinaplon (5).
