= C6H5N3 =

Molecular formula

The molecular formula C_{6}H_{5}N_{3} (molar mass: 119.12 g/mol) may refer to:

- Benzotriazole (BTA)
- Phenyl azide
- Pyrazolopyrimidine
