= C19H28ClN5O =

The molecular formula C_{19}H_{28}ClN_{5}O (molar mass: 377.91 g/mol, exact mass: 377.1982 u) may refer to:

- CJ-033466
- Etoperidone
