= Imidazopyridine =

Class of compounds

Imidazo[1,2-a]pyridine—an example of imidazopyridine and a core structure of zolpidem and some compounds described below.

An imidazopyridine is a nitrogen containing heterocycle that is also a class of drugs that contain this same chemical substructure. In general, they are GABA_{A} receptor agonists, however recently proton pump inhibitors, aromatase inhibitors, NSAIDs and other classes of drugs in this class have been developed as well. Despite usually being similar to them in effect, they are not chemically related to benzodiazepines. As such, GABA_{A}-agonizing imidazopyridines, pyrazolopyrimidines, and cyclopyrrones are sometimes grouped together and referred to as "nonbenzodiazepines." Imidazopyridines include:

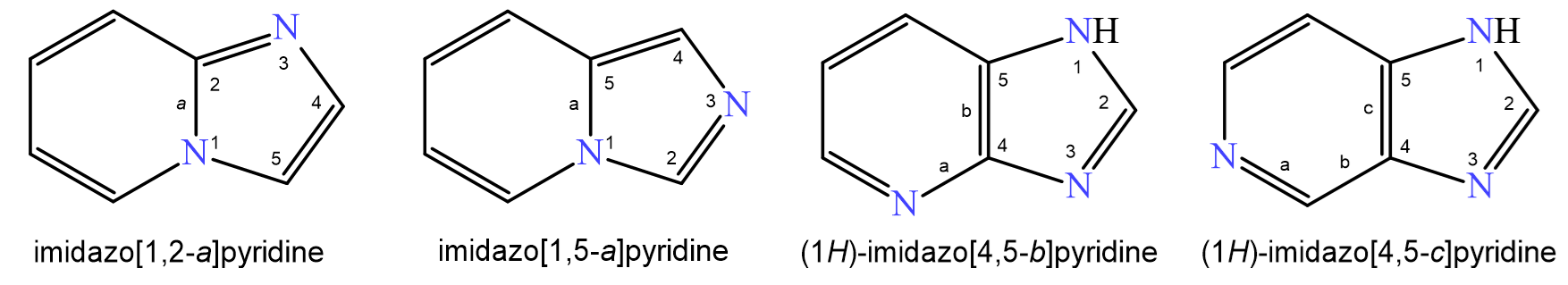
All existing unsubstituted imidazopyridines

== Sedatives ==
Anxiolytics, sedatives and hypnotics (GABA_{A} receptor positive allosteric modulators):

- Imidazo[1,2-a]pyridines:
  - Alpidem (original brand name Ananxyl)—an anxiolytic that was withdrawn from the market worldwide in 1995 due to hepatotoxicity.
  - DS-1—a GABA_{A} receptor positive allosteric modulator selective for the α_{4}β_{3}δ subtype, which is not targeted by other GABAergics such as benzodiazepines or other nonbenzodiazepines.
  - Necopidem—an anxiolytic. It has not found clinical use.
  - Saripidem—a sedative and anxiolytic. It is not used clinically.
  - TP-003—a subtype-selective partial agonist at GABA_{A} receptors, binding to GABA_{A} receptor complexes bearing either α_{2}, α_{3} or α_{5} subunits, but only showing significant efficacy at α_{3}.
  - Zolpidem (original brand name Ambien)—a widely used hypnotic. Generic versions are widely available.
- Imidazo[4,5-c]pyridines:
  - Bamaluzole—a GABA_{A} receptor-agonizing anticonvulsant that was never marketed.

== Antipsychotic ==
Antipsychotics:

- Imidazo[1,2-a]pyridines:
  - Mosapramine (brand name クレミン, Cremin)—an atypical antipsychotic used in Japan.

== Gastrointestinal ==
Drugs used for peptic ulcer disease (PUD), GERD and gastroprokinetic agents (motility stimulants):

- Imidazo[1,2-a]pyridines:
  - CJ-033466—an experimental gastroprokinetic acting as a selective 5-HT_{4} serotonin receptor partial agonist.
  - Zolimidine—a gastroprotective agent.
  - Linaprazan—a potassium-competitive acid blocker which demonstrated similar efficacy as esomeprazole in healing and controlling symptoms of GERD patients with erosive esophagitis.
  - SCH28080—the prototypical potassium-competitive acid blocker which has not found clinical use because of liver toxicity in animal trials and elevated liver enzyme activity in the serum of human volunteers.
- Imidazo[4,5-b]pyridines:
  - Tenatoprazole—it blocks the gastric proton pump leading to decline of gastric acid production.

== Anti-inflammatories ==
NSAIDs, analgesics and antimigraine drugs:

- Imidazo[1,2-a]pyridines:
  - Miroprofen—a derivative of propionic acid.
- Imidazo[4,5-b]pyridines:
  - Telcagepant—a calcitonin gene-related peptide receptor antagonist which was in clinical trials as a remedy for migraine. Its development was terminated.

== Cardiovascular ==
Drugs acting on the cardiovascular system:

- Imidazo[1,2-a]pyridines:
  - Olprinone (loprinone)—a cardiac stimulant.

== Bone ==
Drugs for treatment of bone diseases:

- Imidazo[1,2-a]pyridines:
  - Minodronic acid (brand names Bonoteo, Recalbon)—a third-generation bisphosphonate used for the treatment of osteoporosis.

== Antineoplastic ==
Antineoplastic agents:

- Imidazo[1,5-a]pyridines:
  - Fadrozole (brand name Afema)—an aromatase inhibitor.
- Imidazo[4,5-c]pyridines:
  - 3-Deazaneplanocin A—an S-adenosyl-L-homocysteine synthesis inhibitor and histone methyltransferase EZH2 inhibitor.

== Antiviral ==
Directly-acting antiviral agents:

- Imidazo[1,2-a]pyridines:
  - Tegobuvir (GS-9190) - an allosteric, non-nucleoside hepatitis C virus NS5B RNA-dependent RNA polymerase inhibitor targeting the thumb II allosteric site.

== DAergic ==
- PIP3EA [885446-91-3] D4 agonist, shown to induce penile erection in rats.
