= Indiplon =

Hypnotic sedative drug

Clinical data
- Routes of administration: Oral
- ATC code: none

Pharmacokinetic data
- Elimination half-life: 1.5–1.8 hours

Identifiers
- IUPAC name: N-methyl-N-[3-[3-(thiophene-2-carbonyl) pyrazolo[5,1-b]pyrimidin-7-yl]phenyl]acetamide
- CAS Number: 325715-02-4
- PubChem CID: 6450813
- IUPHAR/BPS: 4221
- ChemSpider: 4953363
- UNII: 8BT63DA42E
- KEGG: D02640
- ChEBI: CHEBI:188583
- ChEMBL: ChEMBL262075
- CompTox Dashboard (EPA): DTXSID80186270
- ECHA InfoCard: 100.133.676

Chemical and physical data
- Formula: C_{20}H_{16}N_{4}O_{2}S
- Molar mass: 376.43 g·mol^{−1}
- 3D model (JSmol): Interactive image
- SMILES: O=C(C1=CC=CS1)C2=C3N=CC=C(C4=CC(N(C)C(C)=O)=CC=C4)N3N=C2
- InChI: InChI=1S/C20H16N4O2S/c1-13(25)23(2)15-6-3-5-14(11-15)17-8-9-21-20-16(12-22-24(17)20)19(26)18-7-4-10-27-18/h3-12H,1-2H3; Key:CBIAWPMZSFFRGN-UHFFFAOYSA-N

Indiplon (INN and USAN) is an unmarketed nonbenzodiazepine, hypnotic sedative that was developed in two formulations—an immediate-release formulation for sleep onset, and a modified-release (also called controlled-release or extended-release) version for sleep maintenance.

== Pharmacology ==
=== Pharmacodynamics ===
Indiplon works by enhancing the action of the inhibitory neurotransmitter GABA, like most other nonbenzodiazepine sedatives. It primarily binds to benzodiazepine sites on α_{1} subunit-containing GABA_{A} receptors in the brain.

=== Pharmacokinetics ===
Indiplon has a short elimination half-life of 1.5 to 1.8 hours in young and elderly subjects, respectively.

== Chemistry ==
Indiplon is a pyrazolopyrimidine related to the nonbenzodiazepine hypnotic zaleplon.

== History ==
Indiplon was discovered at Lederle Laboratories (which was later acquired by Wyeth) in the 1980s and was called CL 285,489. In 1998 Lederle licensed it, along with other early stage drug candidates, to DOV Pharmaceutical, a startup formed by former Lederle employees, and Dov exclusively sublicensed its rights in the drug to Neurocrine Biosciences in that same year. In 2002, Neurocrine entered into an agreement with Pfizer to develop the drug.

Indiplon was originally scheduled for release in 2007, when Sanofi-Aventis' popular hypnotic zolpidem lost its patent rights in the United States and thus became available as a much less expensive generic. In 2002, Neurocrine Biosciences had entered into an agreement with Pfizer to co-market indiplon in the US, in a deal worth a potential $400mn. However, following the issuing of a non-approvable letter for the modified-release 15 mg formulation and an approvable letter with stipulations for the 5 mg and 10 mg immediate-release version by the FDA in May 2006, Pfizer ended its relationship with Neurocrine. Neurocrine's stock price dropped 60% on the news.

Following a resubmission, the FDA in December 2007 deemed Neurocrine's new drug application (NDA) 'approvable' in the 5 and 10 mg formulations, but requested new studies as a prerequisite to approval, including a clinical trial in the elderly, a safety study comparing adverse effects to those of similarly marketed drugs, and a preclinical study examining indiplon's safety in the third trimester of pregnancy.

Following the 2007 FDA letter, Neurocrine decided to discontinue all clinical and marketing development of Indiplon in the United States.
