= GABRD =

Protein-coding gene in humans

Identifiers
- Aliases: GABRD, EIG10, EJM7, GEFSP5, gamma-aminobutyric acid type A receptor delta subunit, gamma-aminobutyric acid type A receptor subunit delta
- External IDs: OMIM: 137163; MGI: 95622; GeneCards: GABRD

Gene location (Human)
Chr.	Chromosome 1 (human)
Band	1p36.33	Start	2,019,329 bp
Band	1p36.33	End	2,030,758 bp

Gene location (Mouse)
Chr.	Chromosome 4 (mouse)
Band	4|4 E2	Start	155,469,437 bp
Band	4|4 E2	End	155,482,569 bp
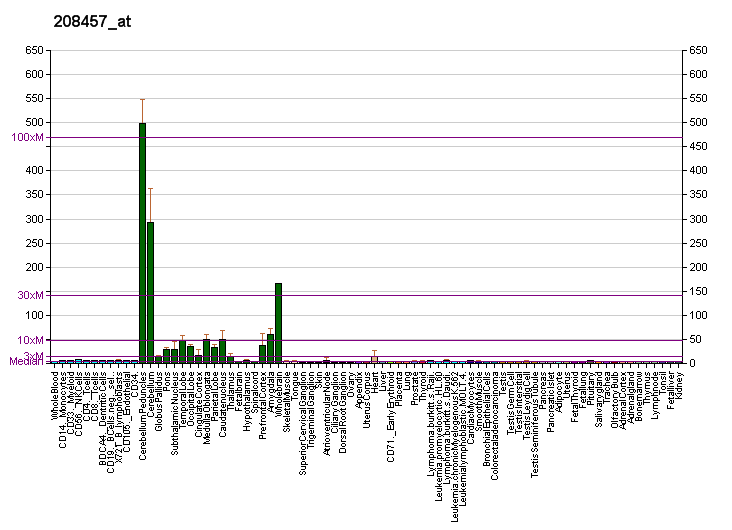
RNA expression pattern
Bgee	Human / Mouse (ortholog); Top expressed in: right hemisphere of cerebellum; right frontal lobe; cerebellar vermis; paraflocculus of cerebellum; prefrontal cortex; primary visual cortex; dorsolateral prefrontal cortex; Brodmann area 9; cingulate gyrus; anterior cingulate cortex / Top expressed in: cerebellar cortex; lobe of cerebellum; cerebellar vermis; superior frontal gyrus; dorsal striatum; lateral geniculate nucleus; olfactory tubercle; primary visual cortex; nucleus accumbens; medial dorsal nucleus; More reference expression data
BioGPS	More reference expression data
Gene ontology
Molecular function	protein binding; chloride channel activity; extracellular ligand-gated ion channel activity; GABA-A receptor activity; ion channel activity; transmembrane signaling receptor activity; transmitter-gated ion channel activity involved in regulation of postsynaptic membrane potential
Cellular component	chloride channel complex; integral component of membrane; cell junction; GABA-A receptor complex; postsynaptic membrane; plasma membrane; synapse; integral component of plasma membrane; membrane; glutamatergic synapse; GABA-ergic synapse; integral component of postsynaptic membrane; neuron projection
Biological process	ion transmembrane transport; chloride transport; chloride transmembrane transport; ion transport; chemical synaptic transmission; signal transduction; regulation of membrane potential; nervous system process; regulation of postsynaptic membrane potential
Sources:Amigo / QuickGO
Orthologs
Databases	NCBI: entry; OMA: entry
Species	Human	Mouse
Entrez	2563	14403
Ensembl	ENSG00000187730	ENSMUSG00000029054
UniProt	O14764	P22933
RefSeq (mRNA)	NM_000815	NM_008072
RefSeq (protein)	NP_000806	NP_032098
Location (UCSC)	Chr 1: 2.02 – 2.03 Mb	Chr 4: 155.47 – 155.48 Mb
PubMed search
- Wikidata
View/Edit Human	View/Edit Mouse

Gamma-aminobutyric acid receptor subunit delta is a protein that in humans is encoded by the GABRD gene. In the mammalian brain, the delta (δ) subunit forms specific GABA_{A} receptor subtypes by co-assembly leading to δ subunit containing GABA_{A} receptors (δ-GABA_{A} receptors).

== Function ==
The delta (δ) subunit, one of the subunits of the hetero-pentameric δ-GABA_{A} receptors, is a determinant subunit for the specific cellular localization of δ-GABA_{A} receptors, which are modulated by the GABA. GABA is the major inhibitory neurotransmitter in the mammalian brain where it acts on the repertoire of GABA_{A} receptors, the ligand-gated chloride channels. It is assembled from a diverse subunit pool, including assemblies from a family of 19 subunits (α1-α6, β1-β3, γ1-γ3, δ, ∈, θ, π and ρ1-ρ3). The GABRD gene encodes the delta (δ) subunit. Specifically, the δ-subunit is usually expressed in GABA_{A} receptors associated with extrasynaptic activity, mediating tonic inhibition, which is slower compared to classical inhibition (phasic or synaptic inhibition). The most common GABA_{A} receptors have the gamma subunit, which allows the receptor to bind benzodiazepines. For this reason, receptors containing δ-subunits (δ-GABA_{A} receptor) are sometimes referred to as "benzodiazepine-insensitive" GABA_{A} receptors. However, they do show an exquisitely high sensitivity to ethanol compared to the benzodiazepine-sensitive receptors, which do not respond to ethanol however these results are not fully confirmed in the literature. The δ-subunit containing receptors are also known to be involved in the ventral tegmental area (VTA) pathway in the brain's hippocampus, which means that they may have implications in learning, memory, and reward.

== Clinical significance ==
=== Neurological and psychiatric disorders ===
Mutations or dysregulation of GABRD and other GABA-A receptor subunits have been implicated in conditions such as epilepsy, anxiety disorders, and certain neurodevelopmental disorders.

Research has suggested that alterations in the GABRD gene may be linked to certain neurological and psychiatric disorders, including anxiety. Anxiety disorders are a group of mental health conditions characterized by excessive and persistent worry, fear, or nervousness. The GABA system, including the GABRD gene, is implicated in the regulation of anxiety and stress responses. While there is ongoing research to understand the complex genetic and neurobiological factors contributing to anxiety disorders, it's important to note that anxiety is a multifaceted condition influenced by a combination of genetic, environmental, and psychological factors. Many genes, neurotransmitters, and brain regions are likely involved in the development and manifestation of anxiety. Individuals with variations in the GABRD gene may exhibit differences in GABA-A receptor function, which could potentially influence their susceptibility to anxiety or other related conditions. However, the interplay of genetics with environmental factors is complex, and it's crucial to consider a holistic perspective when understanding the causes of anxiety.

Epilepsy is a neurological disorder characterized by recurrent, unprovoked seizures. GABAergic neurotransmission, mediated by the GABA-A receptor, is essential for maintaining the balance between excitatory and inhibitory signals in the brain. Changes in the functioning of GABA receptors, including those associated with the GABRD gene, can influence this balance and potentially contribute to the development of epilepsy. Research has suggested that alterations in the GABRD gene may be implicated in certain forms of epilepsy. Mutations or variations in genes encoding GABA receptor subunits can affect the function of these receptors, leading to an imbalance in excitatory and inhibitory neurotransmission, which may contribute to the hyperexcitability observed in epilepsy. It's important to note that epilepsy is a complex disorder with various genetic and environmental factors contributing to its development. While some individuals with epilepsy may have genetic mutations affecting GABA receptors, not all cases are directly linked to specific genes.

GABA levels, known as the neurotransmitter, one of the most important signals of the mammalian brain, have recently been involved in mood disorders. Genetic studies have also shown that some genes are involved in mood disorders. GABARD is one of the strong candidates among these genes. As a result of studies, it has been proven that the 8 subunits encoded by GABRD are linked to major depressive disorders.

=== Cancer ===
GABRD effect has also been observed in some types of cancer. For example, GABRD effect has been observed in colorectal cancer. According to research conducted by scientists, it has been observed that colorectal cancers metastasize. In some neurological diseases, some mutations occur depending on GABRD gene expression, and as a result of these mutations, some diseases occur, for example, epilepsy. Epilepsy is called the sudden discharge process that occurs in the brain, and as a result, sudden contractions occur in the body. but the role of GABRD in epilepsy is less. It has also been observed that it has an effect on autism spectrum disorder as a result of the variation of the GABRD protein. The GABRD gene encodes the δ subunit of the GABA A receptor, which is highly expressed in the brain and mediates tonic inhibition-related signaling. It has also been proven that excessive release of neurotransmitters plays a role in triggering some types of cancer and uncontrolled cell proliferation. In recent studies, GABRD gene expression is at very high levels in colon adenocarcinoma. In addition, scientists have proven in their research that Gabrd expression is excessive in the relevant tissues.

== Tissue distribution ==
The cellular localization of mRNAs of 13 GABA_{A} receptor subunits was analyzed in different brain regions. For example, in the cerebellum, various receptor subtypes are found in cerebellar granule cells and Purkinje cells, whereas in the olfactory bulb, periglomerular cells, tufted cells, and internal granule cells express GABA_{A} receptor subtypes. Specifically, the pattern of cell type-specific δ subunit expression is shown in the table below.

Cell type-specific expression of δ subunit and its co-assembly
Subunit composition	Cell type
α6βδ	Cerebellar granule cells
α1βδ	Hippocampal interneurons, Neocortical interneurons
α4β2δ	Thalamic relay neurons, Striatal spiny neurons, Hippocampal dentate granule cells, Neocortical pyramidal cells

In a technical comparison between quantitative reverse transcriptase PCR and digital PCR, the expression of the rat gabrd gene was examined across three cell types in the somatosensory cortex: neurogliaform cells, fast spiking basket cells and pyramidal cells. Gene expression was detected in all three cell types, but showed marked enrichment in neurogliaform cells versus the other cell types examined. The GABAA receptor delta subunit is profoundly downregulated with chronic intermittent exposure to ethanol, and appears to contribute strongly to pathological alcohol dependence.

The GABRD gene, encoding the delta subunit of the GABAA receptor, exhibits cell type-specific expression patterns. Primarily found in neurons, particularly in brain regions like the hippocampus and cerebral cortex, GABRD plays a crucial role in inhibitory neurotransmission. Its expression dynamically changes during development, influencing synaptic maturation. Emerging evidence suggests GABRD expression in certain glial cells, indicating potential roles in glia-neuron communication. Additionally, GABRD is detected in peripheral tissues, hinting at non-neuronal functions. Altered GABRD expression is linked to neurological disorders, emphasizing its significance.

== Cloning ==
GABA_{A} receptors were initially cloned by the classical method that the peptide sequences obtained from purified (bovine brain) receptors were used to construct synthetic DNA probes to screen brain cDNA libraries. Eventually, this technique have led to the identification of most of the gene family with its isoforms: α1-α6, β1-β3, γ1-γ3 subunits and one δ subunit.

== GFP tagging ==
Subunits of GABA _{A} receptors were tagged by Green Fluorescent Protein (GFP) or its variants (EGFP) to study trafficking, localization, oligomerization, and protein interactions of relevant receptor subtypes and the relevant subunits. Typically, the EGFP or GFP tagging has been done in the N-terminus or C-terminus of the mature peptide sequence of relevant subunit. The GFP tagging of δ-subunit was performed in the different domains of the subunit such as the N-terminus, C-terminus as well as intracellular (cytoplasmic) domain. Nevertheless, despite these and other studies, it is not clear if this subunit requires α and β subunits for the membrane targeting since literature suggests conflicting results. By the use of GFP tagging of this subunit, one group reported that the cell membrane expression of the δ subunit was observed only in the presence of both α and β subunits. However, another group suggested that the δ subunit can target to the cell membrane and the βδ containing receptors exist.

== Ligands ==
=== Agonists ===
- Muscimol is a partial agonist of GABRD with high binding affinity of 1.2nM.
- Gaboxadol is a partial agonist and a allosteric modulator of GABRD.

=== PAMs ===
- DS-1 (drug) (delta selective compound 1) and DS-2 (drug) is a imidazopyridine derivative that acts as a selective PAM of GABRD.
- Ethanol is believed to be a PAM of GABRD.

=== Others ===
- Gabapentin enhances GABRD activity by an unknown mechanism and rapidly increases cell-surface expression levels of GABRD. Gabapentin it is not a PAM and it does not increase inhibitory synaptic activity of GABRD. One study suggests more than one unknown mechanism of action may cause the increase in GABRD receptor expression.

== See also ==
- GABA_{A} receptor
