= Necopidem =

Chemical compound

Clinical data
- ATC code: none

Identifiers
- IUPAC name: N-([2-(4-ethylphenyl)-6-methylimidazo[1,2-a]pyridin-3-yl]methyl)-N,3-dimethylbutanamide
- CAS Number: 103844-77-5
- PubChem CID: 3047786
- ChemSpider: 2310104
- UNII: G4N2F166MN
- ChEMBL: ChEMBL2105143
- CompTox Dashboard (EPA): DTXSID50146109

Chemical and physical data
- Formula: C_{23}H_{29}N_{3}O
- Molar mass: 363.505 g·mol^{−1}
- 3D model (JSmol): Interactive image
- SMILES: O=C(N(C)Cc1c(nc2ccc(cn12)C)c3ccc(cc3)CC)CC(C)C
- InChI: InChI=1S/C23H29N3O/c1-6-18-8-10-19(11-9-18)23-20(15-25(5)22(27)13-16(2)3)26-14-17(4)7-12-21(26)24-23/h7-12,14,16H,6,13,15H2,1-5H3; Key:YRMLUAGKHYADKJ-UHFFFAOYSA-N

Necopidem is a drug in the imidazopyridine family, which is related to the better known drugs zolpidem and alpidem. It is therefore considered a nonbenzodiazepine and as such may have sedative and anxiolytic effects, given its structural similarity to other nonbenzodiazepine hypnotics.
