= SENP3 =

Protein-coding gene in humans

Identifiers
- Aliases: SENP3, SMT3IP1, SSP3, Ulp1, SUMO1/sentrin/SMT3 specific peptidase 3, SUMO specific peptidase 3
- External IDs: OMIM: 612844; MGI: 2158736; GeneCards: SENP3

Gene location (Human)
Chr.	Chromosome 17 (human)
Band	17p13.1	Start	7,561,919 bp
Band	17p13.1	End	7,571,969 bp

Gene location (Mouse)
Chr.	Chromosome 11 (mouse)
Band	11|11 B3	Start	69,563,941 bp
Band	11|11 B3	End	69,572,910 bp
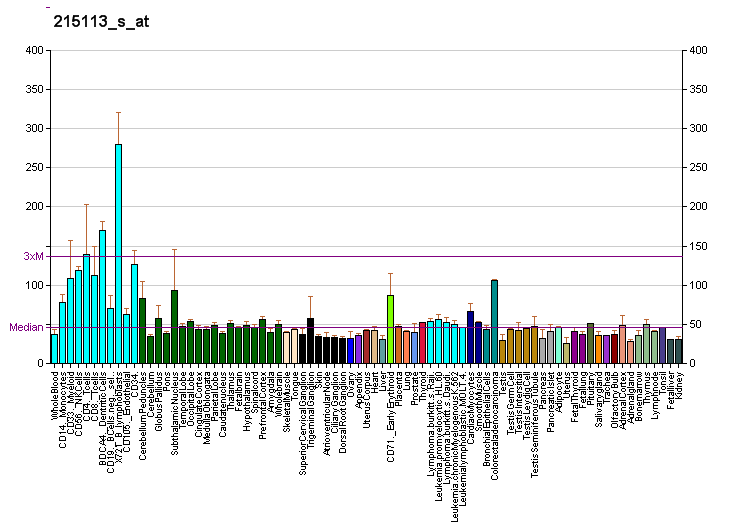

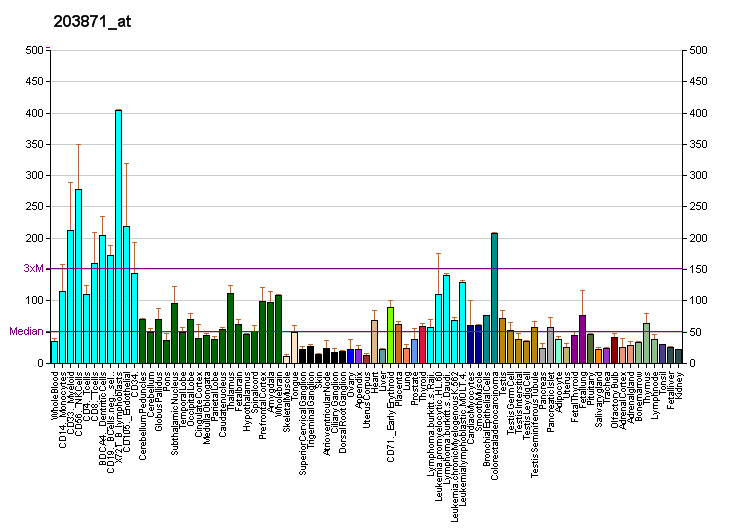
RNA expression pattern
Bgee	Human / Mouse (ortholog); Top expressed in: right hemisphere of cerebellum; right frontal lobe; mucosa of transverse colon; anterior cingulate cortex; ganglionic eminence; anterior pituitary; ventricular zone; muscle layer of sigmoid colon; right lung; right testis / Top expressed in: neural layer of retina; epiblast; spermatocyte; ciliary body; cumulus cell; maxillary prominence; mandibular prominence; ventricular zone; superior frontal gyrus; dentate gyrus of hippocampal formation granule cell; More reference expression data
BioGPS	More reference expression data
Gene ontology
Molecular function	peptidase activity; cysteine-type peptidase activity; endopeptidase activity; protein binding; hydrolase activity
Cellular component	cytoplasm; nucleolus; nucleus; nucleoplasm; MLL1 complex
Biological process	proteolysis; rRNA processing; protein desumoylation
Sources:Amigo / QuickGO
Orthologs
Databases	NCBI: entry; OMA: entry
Species	Human	Mouse
Entrez	26168	80886
Ensembl	ENSG00000161956	ENSMUSG00000005204
UniProt	Q9H4L4	Q9EP97
RefSeq (mRNA)	NM_015670	NM_001163571; NM_030702
RefSeq (protein)	NP_056485	NP_001157043; NP_109627
Location (UCSC)	Chr 17: 7.56 – 7.57 Mb	Chr 11: 69.56 – 69.57 Mb
PubMed search
- Wikidata
View/Edit Human	View/Edit Mouse

SUMO1/sentrin/SMT3 specific peptidase 3, also known as SENP3, is a protein which in humans is encoded by the SENP3 gene.

SENP3 together with SENP5, belongs to the Ulp1 branch in yeast and localize to nucleolus through B23/NPM1. SENP3 is associated and regulated by B23/nucleophosmin/NPM1 and involved in the regulation of ribosome biogenesis. SENP3 may be regulated by Arf-Mdm2-p53 pathway.
