= Zolimidine =

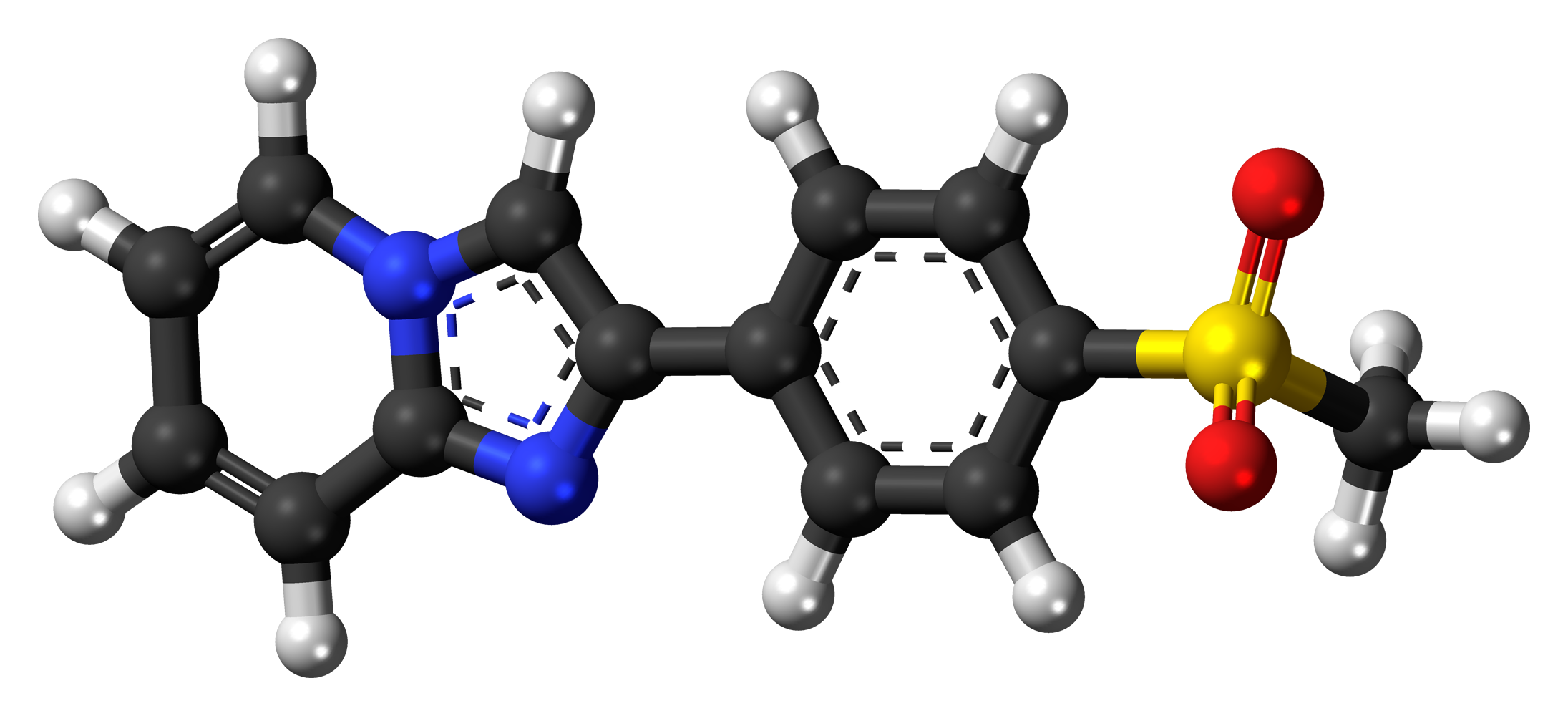

Names
- Preferred IUPAC name 2-[4-(Methanesulfonyl)phenyl]imidazo[1,2-a]pyridine

Identifiers
CAS Number	1222-57-7
3D model (JSmol)	Interactive image
ChemSpider	13985
ECHA InfoCard	100.013.589
KEGG	D07075
PubChem CID	14652
UNII	YCF001N8QB
CompTox Dashboard (EPA)	DTXSID9057630
- InChI: InChI=1S/C14H12N2O2S/c1-19(17,18)12-7-5-11(6-8-12)13-10-16-9-3-2-4-14(16)15-13/h2-10H,1H3 Key: VSLIUWLPFRVCDL-UHFFFAOYSA-N; InChI=1/C14H12N2O2S/c1-19(17,18)12-7-5-11(6-8-12)13-10-16-9-3-2-4-14(16)15-13/h2-10H,1H3 Key: VSLIUWLPFRVCDL-UHFFFAOYAK
- SMILES: CS(=O)(=O)C1=CC=C(C=C1)C2=CN3C=CC=CC3=N2

Properties
Chemical formula	C_{14}H_{12}N_{2}O_{2}S
Molar mass	272.32 g/mol
Density	1.31 g/cm^{3}

Pharmacology
ATC code	A02BX10 (WHO)
- Except where otherwise noted, data are given for materials in their standard state (at 25 °C [77 °F], 100 kPa). verify (what is ?) Infobox references

Zolimidine (zoliridine, brand name Solimidin) is a gastroprotective drug previously used for peptic ulcer and gastroesophageal reflux disease.

== See also ==
- Imidazopyridine
