= Saripidem =

Chemical compound

Clinical data
- ATC code: none

Identifiers
- IUPAC name: N-[[2-(4-chlorophenyl)imidazo[1,2-a]pyridin-3-yl]methyl]-N-methylbutanamide
- CAS Number: 103844-86-6
- PubChem CID: 3058746
- ChemSpider: 2319846
- UNII: 0J6174G60N
- ChEMBL: ChEMBL73416
- CompTox Dashboard (EPA): DTXSID60146110

Chemical and physical data
- Formula: C_{19}H_{20}ClN_{3}O
- Molar mass: 341.84 g·mol^{−1}
- 3D model (JSmol): Interactive image
- SMILES: O=C(N(C)Cc1c(nc2ccccn12)c3ccc(Cl)cc3)CCC
- InChI: InChI=1S/C19H20ClN3O/c1-3-6-18(24)22(2)13-16-19(14-8-10-15(20)11-9-14)21-17-7-4-5-12-23(16)17/h4-5,7-12H,3,6,13H2,1-2H3; Key:LIFDPEORUVTOCP-UHFFFAOYSA-N

Saripidem is a sedative and anxiolytic drug in the imidazopyridine family, which is related to the better known drugs zolpidem and alpidem.

Saripidem has a similar pharmacological profile to the benzodiazepine family of drugs including sedative and anxiolytic properties, but its chemical structure is quite different from that of the benzodiazepine drugs, and saripidem is described as a nonbenzodiazepine.

The mechanism of action by which saripidem produces its sedative and anxiolytic effects is by modulating the benzodiazepine binding site on GABA_{A} receptors, however unlike many older GABA_{A} agonists, saripidem is highly subtype selective and binds primarily to the ω1 subtype.
