= Nucleoplasmin-3 =

Protein found in humans

NPM3

Identifiers
- Aliases: NPM3, PORMIN, TMEM123, nucleophosmin/nucleoplasmin 3
- External IDs: OMIM: 606456; MGI: 894653; GeneCards: NPM3

Gene location (Human)
| Chr. | Chromosome 10 (human) |
| Band | 10q24.32 | Start | 101,781,325 bp |
| Band | 10q24.32 | End | 101,783,413 bp |

Gene location (Mouse)
| Chr. | Chromosome 19 (mouse) |
| Band | 19 C3|19 38.75 cM | Start | 45,736,173 bp |
| Band | 19 C3|19 38.75 cM | End | 45,738,030 bp |
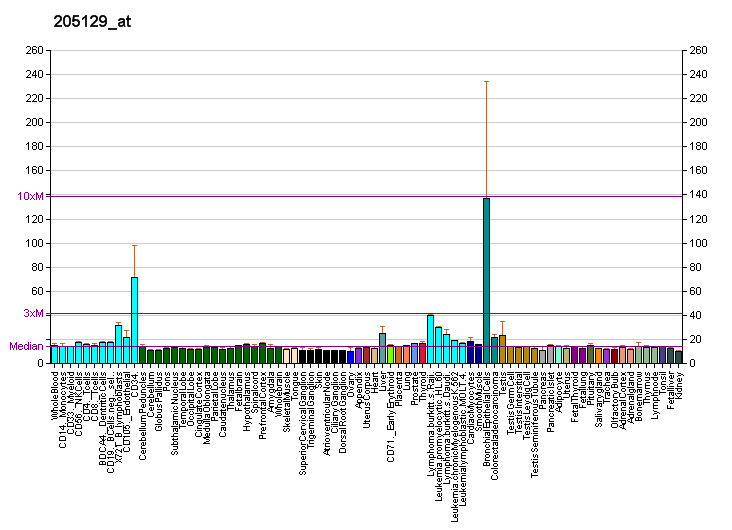
RNA expression pattern
| Bgee | Human / Mouse (ortholog); Top expressed in: oocyte; stromal cell of endometrium; secondary oocyte; gonad; body of pancreas; mucosa of transverse colon; islet of Langerhans; left adrenal cortex; right adrenal gland; right adrenal cortex / Top expressed in: epiblast; spermatocyte; thymus; embryo; yolk sac; testicle; lens; ileum; spermatid; ventricular zone; More reference expression data |
| BioGPS | More reference expression data |
Gene ontology
| Molecular function | protein binding; RNA binding; chromatin binding; histone binding |
| Cellular component | nucleus; nucleolus; cytosol; actin cytoskeleton; nucleoplasm; cytoplasm |
| Biological process | rRNA processing; rRNA transcription; chromatin remodeling |
Sources:Amigo / QuickGO
Orthologs
| Databases | NCBI: entry; OMA: entry |
| Species | Human | Mouse |
| Entrez | 10360 | 18150 |
| Ensembl | ENSG00000107833 | ENSMUSG00000056209 |
| UniProt | O75607 | Q9CPP0 |
| RefSeq (mRNA) | NM_006993 | NM_008723 |
| RefSeq (protein) | NP_008924 | NP_032749 |
| Location (UCSC) | Chr 10: 101.78 – 101.78 Mb | Chr 19: 45.74 – 45.74 Mb |
| PubMed search |
- Wikidata
| View/Edit Human | View/Edit Mouse |

Nucleoplasmin-3 is a protein that in humans is encoded by the NPM3 gene. This protein is involved in the regulation of many different cellular process including ribosome biogenesis, chromatin remodeling, and protein chaperoning. As part of this, 4 copies of this protein bind to 1 copy of nucleophosmin to form an efficient chromatin remodeling protein complex.

The protein encoded by this gene is related to the nuclear chaperone phosphoproteins, nucleoplasmin and nucleophosmin. Based on the structural similarity of the human NPM3 gene product to nucleoplasmin and nucleophosmin, NPM3 may share basic functions with the molecular chaperones.
