= CJ-033466 =

Chemical compound

Identifiers
- IUPAC name: 5-amino-6-chloro-2-methyl-N-[[1-(2-methylpropyl)piperidin-4-yl]methyl]imidazo[1,2-a]pyridine-8-carboxamide
- CAS Number: 519148-48-2
- PubChem CID: 10429706
- ChemSpider: 8605134
- UNII: 9KUW8W70PJ
- CompTox Dashboard (EPA): DTXSID00199882

Chemical and physical data
- Formula: C_{19}H_{28}ClN_{5}O
- Molar mass: 377.92 g·mol^{−1}
- 3D model (JSmol): Interactive image
- SMILES: C3CN(CC(C)C)CCC3CNC(=O)c1cc(Cl)c(N)n(cc2C)c1n2
- InChI: InChI=1S/C19H28ClN5O/c1-12(2)10-24-6-4-14(5-7-24)9-22-19(26)15-8-16(20)17(21)25-11-13(3)23-18(15)25/h8,11-12,14H,4-7,9-10,21H2,1-3H3,(H,22,26); Key:ISKHMDNIWXPUGR-UHFFFAOYSA-N

CJ-033466 is a drug which acts as a potent and selective 5-HT_{4} serotonin receptor partial agonist. In animal tests it stimulated gastrointestinal motility with 30 times the potency of cisapride, and with lower affinity for the hERG channel.

== See also ==
- Imidazopyridine
