= Pyrazolopyrimidine =

Pyrazolo[1,5-a]pyrimidine

Names
- Preferred IUPAC name Pyrazolo[1,5-a]pyrimidine

Identifiers
CAS Number	274-71-5
3D model (JSmol)	Interactive image
ChemSpider	9811537
ECHA InfoCard	100.227.461
PubChem CID	11636795
UNII	NX2KR7M4A4
CompTox Dashboard (EPA)	DTXSID70469781
- InChI: InChI=1S/C6H5N3/c1-3-7-6-2-4-8-9(6)5-1/h1-5H Key: LDIJKUBTLZTFRG-UHFFFAOYSA-N; InChI=1/C6H5N3/c1-3-7-6-2-4-8-9(6)5-1/h1-5H Key: LDIJKUBTLZTFRG-UHFFFAOYAL
- SMILES: n1cccn2nccc12

Properties
Chemical formula	C_{6}H_{5}N_{3}
Molar mass	119.127 g·mol^{−1}
- Except where otherwise noted, data are given for materials in their standard state (at 25 °C [77 °F], 100 kPa). Infobox references

Pyrazolopyrimidines are a series of isomeric heterocyclic chemical compounds with the molecular formula C_{6}H_{5}N_{3}. They form the central core of a variety of more complex chemical compounds including some pharmaceuticals and pesticides.

== Pharmaceuticals ==
One isomer of pyrazolopyrimidines, known as pyrazolo[1,5-a]pyrimidine, is the basis for a class of sedative and anxiolytic drugs related (in terms of their effect) to benzodiazepines.

Most of the drugs from this class marketed to date are intended to induce sleep, and are prescribed for people suffering insomnia, however some newer compounds produce anxiolytic effects with relatively little sedation, and are being developed for use as non-sedating anti-anxiety drugs.

They include:

- Zaleplon - hypnotic (trade name Sonata)
- Indiplon - hypnotic
- Ocinaplon - anxiolytic
- Lorediplon - hypnotic

As they are not chemically related to the benzodiazepines despite their similar effect, such drugs—as well as the imidazopyridines and cyclopyrrones—are sometimes grouped together and referred to as "nonbenzodiazepines".

Zaleplon

== Pesticides ==
A related use is in pyrazolopyrimidine organothiophosphate pesticides including chlorprazophos (insecticide) and pyrazophos (fungicide, insecticide).

Pyrazophos

== See also ==
- Nonbenzodiazepine
