= Nucleophosmin =

Protein-coding gene in humans

An Error has occurred retrieving Wikidata item for infobox Nucleophosmin (NPM), also known as nucleolar phosphoprotein B23 or numatrin, is a protein that in humans is encoded by the NPM1 gene.

== Discovery ==
NPM1 was first discovered as a nucleolar phosphoprotein in rat liver cells and Novikoff hepatoma ascites cells. It was named B23 as it was the 23rd spot in the B section of the 2-D gel where spots were numbered in the order of decreasing mobility. It was named numatrin independently by another group as it was found to be tightly associated with the nuclear matrix and its expression was induced upon mitogenic signals in human B lymphocytes. At around the same time, the Xenopus NO38 was discovered and was found to be homologous to Xenopus Nucleoplasmin and rat B23.

== Gene ==
In humans, the NPM1 gene is located on the long arm of chromosome 5 (5q35). The gene spans 23 kb and contains 12 exons. Three transcript variants have been described. The longest isoform (294 amino acids long), encoded by transcript variant 1, is the major and the most well studied isoform of Nucleophosmin. Transcript variant 2 is produced by skipping an in-frame exon (exon 8) to produce an isoform that is 265 amino acids long. However, this isoform is not well characterized and its functions and expression pattern is not well understood. Transcript variant 3 is produced by using an alternate exon (exon 10) which results in an isoform 259 amino acids long with a different C-terminal sequence. The isoforms 1 and 3 of human NPM1 are B23.1 and B23.2 respectively in rat. The isoform 1 is localized to the nucleolus as is reported for rat B23.1 whereas the isoform 3 (B23.2) is nucleoplasmic or cytoplasmic in localization and is expressed at relatively lower levels as compared to isoform 1 in normal rat tissues and in HeLa cells. Both isoforms 1 and 3 have been shown to stimulate the replication of adenoviral DNA complexed with viral basic proteins.

== Structure ==
The NPM1 protein can be divided into several domains with sequence motifs that are conserved across nucleoplasmin family and have important and distinct functions. The N-terminal core domain, the acidic stretches, basic domain and the aromatic nucleic acid domain make up the NPM1 protein. Further, sequence motifs such as the nuclear export signals (NES), nuclear localization signals (NLS) and the nucleolar localization signals (NoLS) are critical for the localization of NPM1 to the nucleolus as well as its nucleo-cytoplasmic shuttling required for its diverse array of functions.

The N-terminal domain also known as the core domain (residues 1-119 of human NPM1) is the most conserved domain among the NPM family proteins. This domain folds into a distinct structure that is protease resistant and is responsible for the oligomerization and chaperone activity of these proteins. It contains several hydrophobic residues that are highly conserved (~80%) among NPM proteins. The crystal structure of NPM1 core domain (residues 9-122) shows that this domain folds into an eight stranded β-barrel with jelly roll topology forming a wedge shaped hydrophobic core that fits snugly to form a pentamer through hydrophobic interactions between the monomeric subunits. Two pentameric complexes align in a head to head fashion to form the decameric structure. A comparison between the crystal structure of human NPM1 and that of the core domains of Xenopus NO38, Xenopus Nucleoplasmin and Drosophila Nucleoplasmin like protein (dNLP) show that both the monomeric and pentameric structures are highly similar among all the NPM family proteins. The human NPM1 core domain (residues 15-118) shares a sequence identity of 80%, 51% and 29% with Xenopus NO38, Nucleoplasmin and Drosophila NLP cores respectively. All of them form the same β barrel structure with jelly roll topology.

NPM1 was speculated to be a hexamer under native conditions since it was found to have a molecular weight of 230–255 kDa calculated by gel filtration chromatography and sedimentation analyses. However, the crystal structure of the NPM1 core clearly shows that it is a pentamer. The pentamer-pentamer interface consists of several water molecules involved in hydrogen bonding between the two pentamers. Moreover, ten charge based interactions between the Asp of the highly conserved AKDE loop and Lys82 give additional stability. Comparison of dNLP and Nucleoplasmin structures has revealed that formation of the decamer might be facilitated by histone binding. The H2A-H2B dimer may bind to the lateral surface of the NPM1 decamer. Furthermore, comparison of the crystal structures of human NPM1 and Xenopus NO38 reveals structural plasticity in the pentamer-pentamer interface. When one of the pentamers of human NPM1 and Xenopus NO38 are superimposed, there is a large rotational offset (~20°) between the other pentamers. Further, the direction of the rotational offsets are opposite for human NPM1 and Xenopus NO38 when compared to Xenopus Nucleoplasmin core structure. The significance of this structural plasticity is not well understood, however, it may have a significance in the chaperone function of NPM1.

== Function ==
NPM1 is associated with nucleolar ribonucleoprotein structures and binds single-stranded and double-stranded nucleic acids, but it binds preferentially G-quadruplex-forming nucleic acids. It is involved in the biogenesis of ribosomes and may assist small basic proteins in their transport to the nucleolus. Its regulation through SUMOylation (by SENP3 and SENP5) is another facet of the protein's regulation and cellular functions.

It is located in the nucleolus, but it can be translocated to the nucleoplasm in case of serum starvation or treatment with anticancer drugs. The protein was identified as a phosphoprotein. However, later other post-translational modifications for NPM1 were identified including acetylation and SUMOylation.

Nucleophosmin has multiple functions:

1. Histone chaperones
2. Ribosome biogenesis and transport
3. Genomic stability and DNA repair
4. Endoribonuclease activity
5. Centrosome duplication during cell cycle
6. Regulation of ARF-p53 tumor suppressor pathway
7. RNA helix destabilizing activity
8. Inhibition of caspase-activated DNase
9. Prevents apoptosis when located in nucleolus

=== Molecular and histone chaperone ===
NPM1 functions as a molecular chaperone for several proteins. Both the N-terminal hydrophobic core domain and acidic stretches are important for this activity. Furthermore, oligomerization of NPM1 has been shown to be necessary for maximum chaperone activity. NPM1 has been predicted to play a role in preventing protein aggregation in the densely packed nucleolus, especially during ribosome biogenesis. NPM1 shows characteristic properties of molecular chaperones such as a) preventing temperature dependent and independent aggregation of proteins, b) preserving enzyme activities during thermal denaturation of several different proteins, c) promoting the renaturation of previously denatured proteins, d) preferentially binding to denatured proteins, and exposing hydrophobic regions during interaction with other proteins. NPM1 can bind to ATP, yet, its chaperoning function does not require ATP hydrolysis or the presence of ATP.

NPM1 is known to associate with pre-ribosomal particles and other nucleolar proteins. Since ribosomal proteins tend to be insoluble under physiological conditions, NPM1 presumably binds to ribosomal proteins in the nucleolus, preventing them from aggregation and promoting their assembly into the ribosomal subunits. Similarly, certain viral proteins such as HIV-1 Rev that are insoluble under physiological conditions, bind to NPM1 which prevents their aggregation and allows their accumulation in the nucleus/nucleolus thereby promoting viral particle assembly. Further, since NPM1 can shuttle between the nucleus and the cytoplasm by virtue of its NES and NLS, it could help in co-translational folding of client proteins in the cytoplasm and promote their entry into the nucleus/nucleolus.

NPM1 is a highly acidic protein and can bind to histones directly because of their basic nature. NPM1 binding to histones is retained even at a salt concentration of 0.5 M KCl suggesting a strong binding with the help of electrostatic interactions. However, electrostatic interactions alone are not responsible for binding to histones as is suggested by the NPM1 core crystal structure. NPM1 directly binds to core histones H2B, H3 and H4 and can bind to H2A only in the presence of the H2A-H2B dimer or the core histone octamer. It can assemble nucleosomes in vitro and can decondense sperm chromatin similar to nucleoplasmin. NPM1 histone chaperone activity has been suggested to be involved in nucleosome disassembly during transcription resulting in activation of transcription. It is also presumed to function as a histone chaperone in the nucleolus. Depletion of NPM1 or overexpression of a mutant NPM1 lacking histone chaperone activity leads to a decrease in rDNA transcription. It can also bind to linker histone H1 and promote its assembly or disassembly from chromatin.

=== Ribosome biogenesis ===
NPM1 is a molecular chaperone. It was also observed to associate with preribosomes, hence it was initially thought that NPM1 is a ribosome assembly factor or a ribosome chaperone. Other characteristic properties that suggest NPM1 role in ribosome biogenesis are nucleolar localization, ability to shuttle between the nucleus and cytoplasm, ability to bind to nucleic acid and to transport pre-ribosomal particles. NPM1 also has an intrinsic ribonuclease activity that cleaves a specific site in the ITS2 (Internal transcribed spacer 2) of the pre-5.8S rRNA. Knockdown of NPM1 leads to changes in the profiles of ribosomes. (Grisendi et al., 2005) Degradation of NPM1 induced by ARF leads to defects in the processing of pre-ribosomal RNA from the 32S precursor rRNA to the 28S rRNA species (Itahana et al., 2003). Moreover, blocking the NPM1 nucleo-cytoplasmic shuttling inhibits ribosome subunit export resulting in a decrease in the cell growth rate showing that NPM1 exports pre-ribosomes (Maggi et al., 2008). Furthermore, NPM1 interacts with a number of ribosomal proteins including RPL5 (Yu et al., 2006), RPS9 (Lindström and Zhang, 2008) and RPL23 (Wanzel et al., 2008). NPM3 was shown to bind to NPM1 and negatively regulate ribosome biogenesis whereas an NPM1 binding defective mutant of NPM3 did not have any effect on ribosome biogenesis (Huang et al., 2001). Interestingly, NPM1 isoform 3 that does not have a nucleic acid binding domain also inhibits ribosome biogenesis. All these findings suggest an important role of NPM1 in ribosome biogenesis.

Most cancer cells have enlarged nucleoli and the aberrant overexpression of NPM1 has been correlated well with the increased ribosome biogenesis in highly proliferating cells. Thus NPM1 by controlling ribosome biogenesis could control the proliferative rate of cells. NPM1 knockout mouse embryos survive upto mid-gestation (9.5dpc-12.5dpc) (Colombo et al., 2005; Grisendi et al., 2005), whereas, knockout of pescadillo, a protein involved in ribosome biogenesis, leads to death of the embryos at morula stages (2.5 dpc) (Lerch-Gaggl et al., 2002). This suggests that either NPM1 may not be essential for ribosome biogenesis, as other proteins could have overlapping functions with NPM1 or there could be other factors such as ribosome storage in oocytes that could have compensated for the loss of NPM1 in NPM1 null embryos (Grisendi et al., 2006).

=== Role in transcriptional regulation ===
NPM1 has been shown to be an important co-activator for RNA Polymerase II driven transcription. Acetylation of NPM1 enhances this activity through increased histone binding and chaperone activity. Intriguingly acetylated NPM1 (AcNPM1) is a distinct pool localized in the nucleoplasm in contrast to the nucleolar localization of unmodified and phosphorylated NPM1. Genome-wide profiling of AcNPM1 occupancy by ChIP-sequencing reveals that it localizes to the transcription start site of many gene promoters and is co-occupied with RNA Polymerase II.

== Clinical significance ==
The NPM1 gene is up-regulated, mutated and chromosomally translocated in many tumor types. Chromosomal aberrations involving NPM1 were found in patients with non-Hodgkin lymphoma, acute promyelocytic leukemia, myelodysplastic syndrome, and acute myelogenous leukemia. Heterozygous mice for NPM1 are vulnerable to tumor development. In solid tumors NPM1 is frequently found overexpressed, and it is thought that NPM1 could promote tumor growth by inactivation of the tumor suppressor p53/ARF pathway; on the contrary, when expressed at low levels, NPM1 could suppress tumor growth by the inhibition of centrosome duplication.

Of high importance is NPM involvement in acute myelogenous leukemia, where a mutated protein lacking a folded C-terminal domain (NPM1c+) has been found in the cytoplasm in patients. This aberrant localization has been linked to the development of the disease, and is associated with improved clinical outcomes. Strategies against this subtype of acute myelogenous leukemia include the refolding of the C-terminal domain using pharmacological chaperones and the displacement of the protein from nucleolus to nucleoplasm, which has been linked to apoptotic mechanisms. It has also been shown that in the context of clonal hematopoiesis of undetermined significance harboring a DNMT3A mutation, subsequent NPM1 mutations drive progression into overt myeloproliferative neoplasm.

In addition, NPM1 is overexpressed in many solid tumors including gastric, colon, breast, ovary, bladder, oral, thyroid, brain, liver, prostate cancer and multiple myeloma. NPM1 overexpression correlates well with the clinical features of hepatocellular carcinoma suggesting that NPM1 overexpression could serve as a diagnostic marker for hepatocellular carcinoma. NPM1 overexpression and hyperacetylation progresses according to the increasing grade of tumor in OSCC. NPM1 overexpression also correlates well with recurrence and progression of bladder cancer to advanced stages. NPM1 overexpression is associated with acquired oestrogen-independence in human breast cancer cells (Skaar et al., 1998). Moreover, NPM1 is a direct transcriptional target of oncogenic transcription factor c-myc (Zeller et al., 2001). The ability of NPM1 to suppress apoptosis and promote DNA repair might be responsible for the survival of tumor cells where NPM1 is overexpressed. All these studies suggest that NPM1 overexpression promotes tumor development and hence could function as a proto-oncogene.

== Interactions ==
NPM1 has been shown to interact with

- AKT1,
- BARD1,
- BRCA1, and
- nucleolin.
- linker histone H1.

Nucleophosmin has multiple binding partners:

1. rRNA
2. HIV Rev and Rex peptide
3. p53 tumor suppressor
4. ARF tumor suppressor
5. MDM2 (mouse double minute 2, ubiquitin ligase)
6. Ribosome protein S9
7. Phosphatidylinositol 3,4,5-triphosphate (PIP3)
8. Exportin-1 (CRM1, chromosome region maintenance)
9. Nucleolin/C23
10. Transcription target of myc oncogene
