= NAP1L1 =

Protein-coding gene in the species Homo sapiens

Identifiers
- Aliases: NAP1L1, NAP1, NAP1L, NRP, nucleosome assembly protein 1 like 1
- External IDs: OMIM: 164060; MGI: 1855693; GeneCards: NAP1L1

Gene location (Human)
Chr.	Chromosome 12 (human)
Band	12q21.2	Start	76,036,585 bp
Band	12q21.2	End	76,084,735 bp
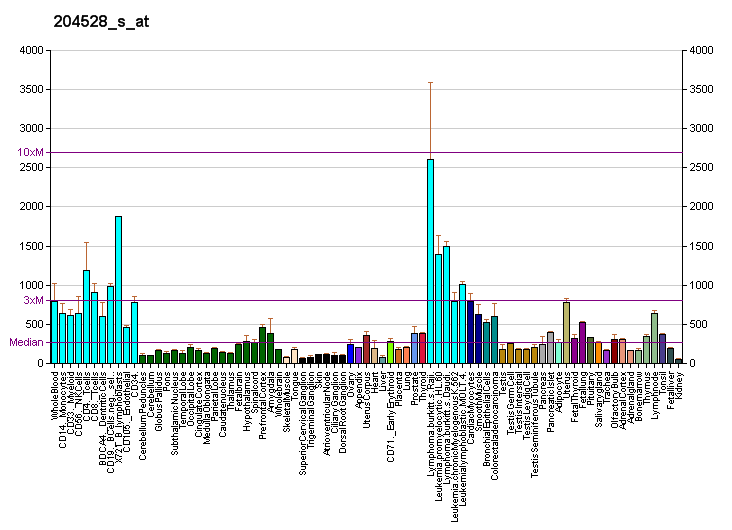

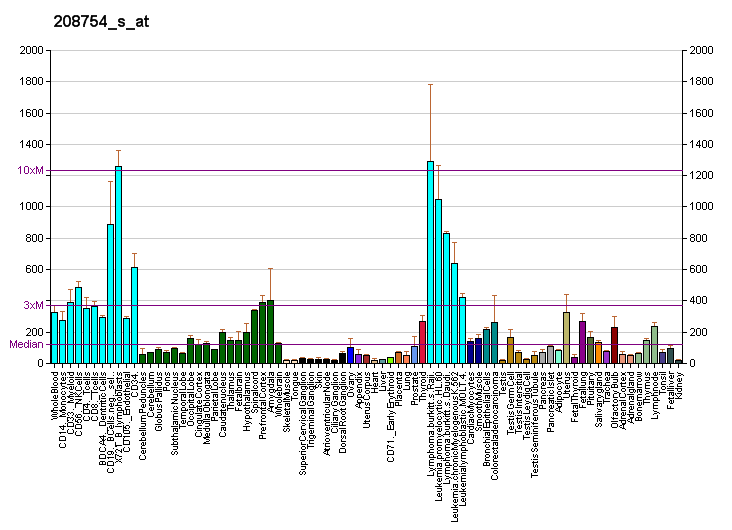

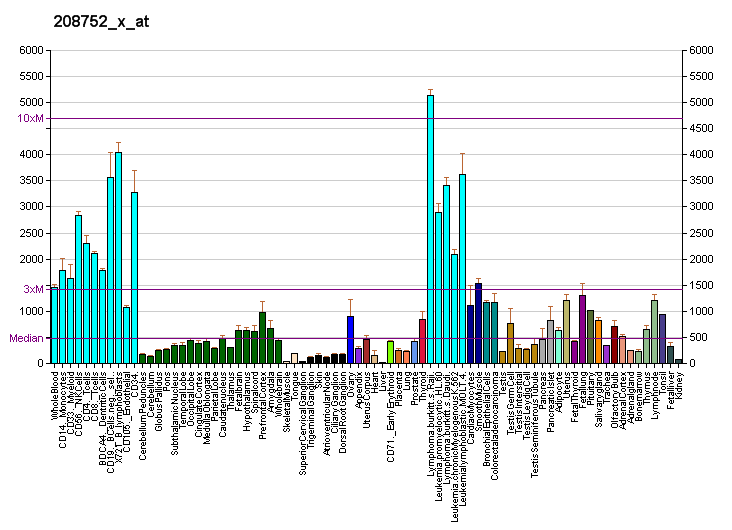
RNA expression pattern
Bgee	Human / Mouse (ortholog); Top expressed in: Achilles tendon; ganglionic eminence; ventricular zone; secondary oocyte; ovary; lower lobe of lung; left ovary; right lung; right ovary; monocyte / n/a; More reference expression data
BioGPS	More reference expression data
Gene ontology
Molecular function	protein binding; RNA binding
Cellular component	melanosome; membrane; nucleus; cytoplasm
Biological process	DNA replication; nucleosome assembly; positive regulation of cell population proliferation; nervous system development; positive regulation of neurogenesis; positive regulation of neural precursor cell proliferation
Sources:Amigo / QuickGO
Orthologs
Databases	NCBI: entry; OMA: entry
Species	Human	Mouse
Entrez	4673	53605
Ensembl	ENSG00000187109	n/a
UniProt	P55209	P28656
RefSeq (mRNA)	NM_001307924; NM_004537; NM_139207; NM_001330231; NM_001330232	NM_001146707; NM_015781; NM_001358932
RefSeq (protein)	NP_001294853; NP_001317160; NP_001317161; NP_004528; NP_631946	NP_056596; NP_001345861
Location (UCSC)	Chr 12: 76.04 – 76.08 Mb	n/a
PubMed search
- Wikidata
View/Edit Human	View/Edit Mouse

Nucleosome assembly protein 1-like 1 is a protein that in humans is encoded by the NAP1L1 gene.

This gene encodes a member of the nucleosome assembly protein (NAP) family. This protein participates in DNA replication and may play a role in modulating chromatin formation and contribute to the regulation of cell proliferation. Alternative splicing of this gene results in several transcript variants; however, not all have been fully described.
