= Zaleplon =

Medication used to treat insomnia

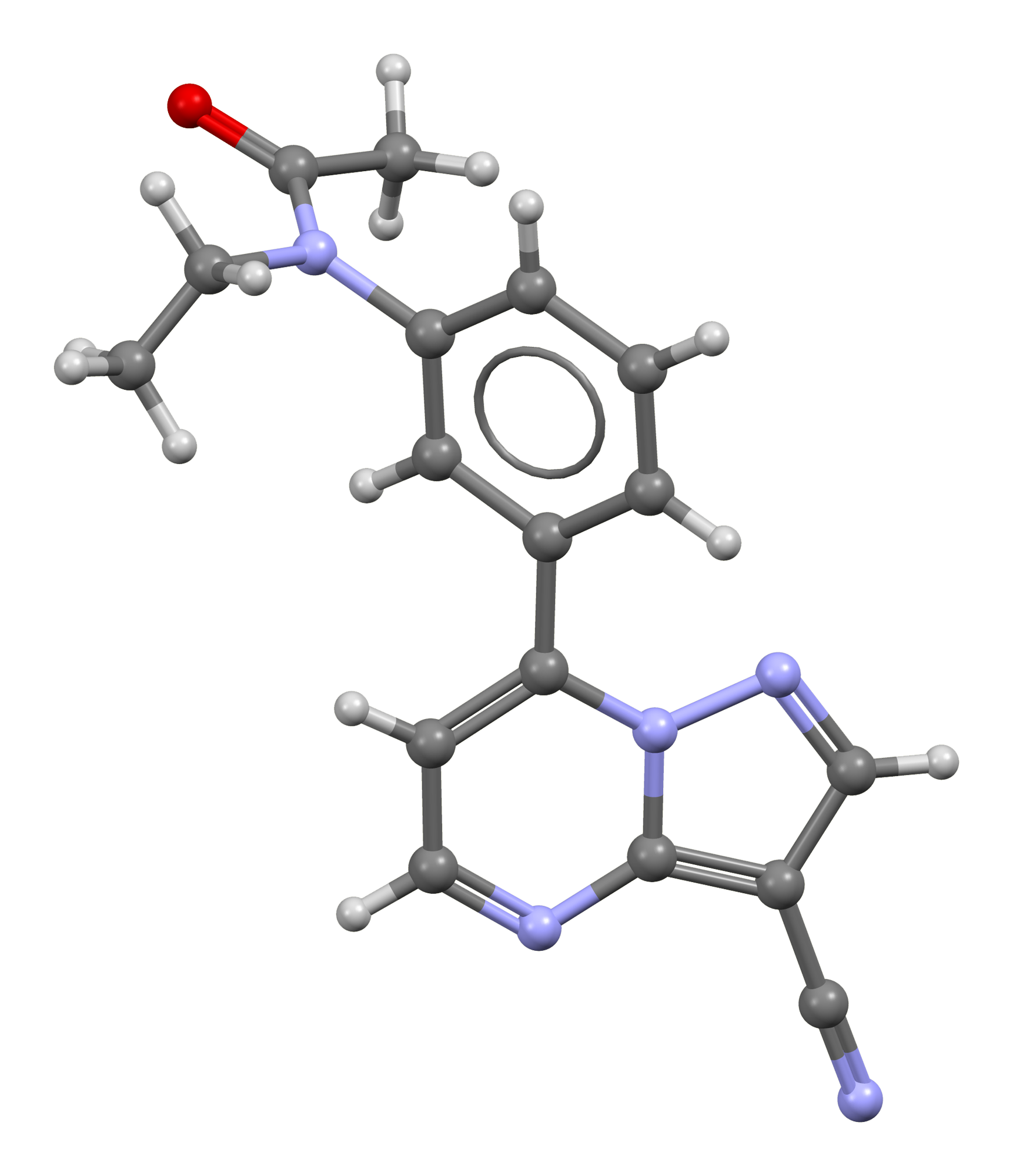

Clinical data
- Trade names: Sonata, others
- AHFS/Drugs.com: Monograph
- MedlinePlus: a601251
- License data: US DailyMed: Zaleplon
- Dependence liability: High
- Addiction liability: Moderate
- Routes of administration: By mouth
- Drug class: Nonbenzodiazepine
- ATC code: N05CF03 (WHO)

Legal status
- Legal status: BR: Class B1 (Psychoactive drugs); NZ: Not available in NZ; UK: Class C; US: Schedule IV

Pharmacokinetic data
- Bioavailability: 30% (oral)
- Metabolism: Liver aldehyde oxidase (91%), CYP3A4 (9%)
- Metabolites: No active metabolites
- Onset of action: 10–30 minutes
- Elimination half-life: 1 hour
- Duration of action: 4–6 hours
- Excretion: Kidney

Identifiers
- IUPAC name: N-(3-(3-cyanopyrazolo[1,5-a] pyrimidin-7-yl)phenyl)-N-ethylacetamide
- CAS Number: 151319-34-5
- PubChem CID: 5719
- IUPHAR/BPS: 4345
- DrugBank: DB00962
- ChemSpider: 5517
- UNII: S62U433RMH
- KEGG: D00530
- ChEBI: CHEBI:10102
- ChEMBL: ChEMBL1521
- CompTox Dashboard (EPA): DTXSID5023748
- ECHA InfoCard: 100.126.674

Chemical and physical data
- Formula: C_{17}H_{15}N_{5}O
- Molar mass: 305.341 g·mol^{−1}
- 3D model (JSmol): Interactive image
- SMILES: CCN(C(C)=O)c1cccc(-c2ccnc3c(C#N)cnn23)c1
- InChI: InChI=1S/C17H15N5O/c1-3-21(12(2)23)15-6-4-5-13(9-15)16-7-8-19-17-14(10-18)11-20-22(16)17/h4-9,11H,3H2,1-2H3; Key:HUNXMJYCHXQEGX-UHFFFAOYSA-N

Zaleplon, sold under the brand name Sonata among others, is a sedative and hypnotic which is used to treat insomnia. It is a nonbenzodiazepine or Z-drug of the pyrazolopyrimidine class. It was developed by King Pharmaceuticals and approved for medical use in the United States in 1999.

== Medical uses ==
Zaleplon is slightly effective in treating insomnia, primarily characterized by difficulty falling asleep. Zaleplon significantly reduces the time required to fall asleep by improving sleep latency and may therefore facilitate sleep induction rather than sleep maintenance. Due to its ultrashort elimination half-life, zaleplon may not be effective in reducing premature awakenings; however, it may be administered to alleviate middle-of-the-night awakenings. However, zaleplon has not been empirically shown to increase total sleep time.

Zaleplon does not significantly affect driving performance the morning following bedtime administration or 4 hours after middle-of-the-night administration. It may have advantages over benzodiazepines with fewer adverse effects.

=== Special populations ===
Zaleplon is not recommended for chronic use in the elderly. The elderly are more sensitive to the adverse effects of zaleplon such as cognitive side effects. Zaleplon may increase the risk of injury among the elderly. It should not be used during pregnancy or lactation. Clinicians should devote more attention when prescribing for patients with a history of alcohol or drug abuse, psychotic illness, or depression.

In addition, some contend the efficacy and safety of long-term use of these agents remains to be enumerated, but nothing concrete suggests long-term use poses any direct harm to a person.

== Adverse effects ==
The adverse effects of zaleplon are similar to the adverse effects of benzodiazepines, although with less next-day sedation, and in two studies zaleplon use was found not to cause an increase in traffic accidents, as compared to other hypnotics currently on the market.

Sleeping pills, including zaleplon, have been associated with an increased risk of death.

Some evidence suggests that zaleplon is less likely to produce rebound insomnia and other withdrawal symptoms following abrupt discontinuation compared to zolpidem. However, there is insufficient evidence to estimate the incidence of dependence with zaleplon at recommended dosages.

== Interactions ==
The CYP3A4 liver enzyme is a minor metabolic pathway for zaleplon, normally metabolizing about 9% of the drug. CYP3A4 inducers such as rifampicin, phenytoin, carbamazepine, and phenobarbital can reduce the effectiveness of zaleplon, and therefore the FDA suggests that other hypnotic drugs be considered in patients taking a CYP3A4 inducer.

Additional sedation has been observed when zaleplon is combined with thioridazine, but it is not clear whether this was due to merely an additive effect of taking two sedative drugs at once or a true drug-drug interaction. Diphenhydramine, a weak inhibitor of aldehyde oxidase, has not been found to affect the pharmacokinetics of zaleplon.

== Pharmacology ==
=== Mechanism of action ===
Zaleplon is a high-selectivity, high-affinity ligand of positive modulatory benzodiazepine sites on GABA_{A} receptors. Zaleplon binds preferentially at benzodiazepine sites on α1-containing GABA_{A} receptors (previously known as BZ1/Ω1 receptors), which largely mediate the sedative effects of benzodiazepines. However, unlike zolpidem, zaleplon binds with appreciable affinity to benzodiazepine sites on some α2 and α3-containing GABA_{A} receptors, which are implicated in the anxiolytic and muscle relaxant effects of benzodiazepines. Zaleplon demonstrates greater selectivity at these sites than lorazepam or zopiclone.

At therapeutic doses, zaleplon appears to have relatively little effect on sleep architecture compared to nonselective benzodiazepines, which generally reduce slow-wave and REM sleep.

A meta-analysis of randomized, controlled clinical trials which compared benzodiazepines against zaleplon or other Z-drugs such as zolpidem, zopiclone, and eszopiclone has found few clear and consistent differences between zaleplon and the benzodiazepines in terms of sleep onset latency, total sleep duration, number of awakenings, quality of sleep, adverse events, tolerance, rebound insomnia, and daytime alertness.

Zaleplon increases EEG power density in the δ-frequency band and a decrease in the energy of the θ-frequency band. In contrast to non-selective benzodiazepine drugs and zopiclone, zaleplon does not increase power in the β-frequency band.

=== Pharmacokinetics ===
The ultrashort 1hr half-life gives Zaleplon a unique advantage over other hypnotics because of its lack of next-day residual effects on driving and other performance-related skills.

Zaleplon is primarily metabolised by aldehyde oxidase into 5-oxozaleplon, and its half-life may be affected by substances which inhibit or induce aldehyde oxidase. According to urine analysis, about 9% of zaleplon is metabolized by CYP3A4 to form desethylzaleplon, which is quickly metabolized by aldehyde oxidase to 5-oxodesethylzaleplon. All of these metabolites are inactive. When taken orally, zaleplon reaches maximum concentration in about 45 minutes.

== Chemistry ==
Zaleplon is classified as a pyrazolopyrimidine. Pure zaleplon in its solid state is a white to off-white powder with very low solubility in water, as well as low solubility in ethanol and propylene glycol. It has a constant octanol-water partition coefficient of log P = 1.23 in the pH range between 1 and 7.

=== Synthesis ===
Zaleplon synthesis

The synthesis starts with the condensation of 3-acetylacetanilide (1) with N,N-dimethylformamide dimethyl acetal (DMFDMA) to give the eneamide (2). The anilide nitrogen is then alkylated by means of sodium hydride and ethyl iodide to give 3. The first step in the condensation with 3-amino-4-cyanopyrazole can be visualized as involving an addition-elimination reaction sequence on the eneamide function to give a transient intermediate such as 5. Cyclization then leads to the formation of the fused pyrimidine ring to afford zaleplon (6).

== Society and culture ==
=== Recreational use ===
Zaleplon has the potential to be a drug of recreational use, and has been found to have an addictive potential similar to benzodiazepine and benzodiazepine-like hypnotics.

Some individuals use a different delivery method than prescribed, such as insufflation, to induce effects faster.

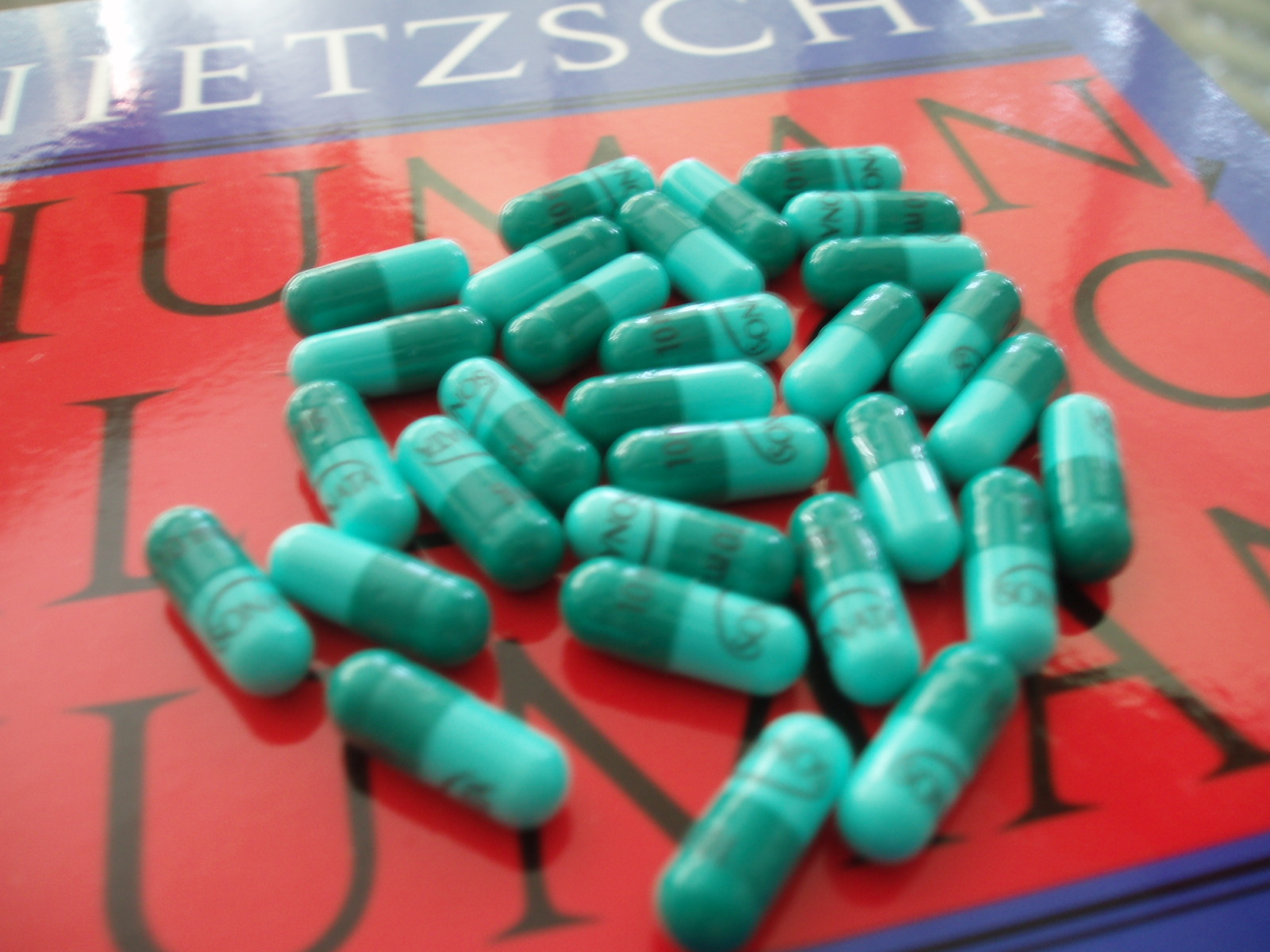
Sonata 10-mg capsules

Anterograde amnesia can occur and can cause one to lose track of the amount of zaleplon already ingested, prompting the ingesting of more than originally planned.

=== Aviation use ===
The Federal Aviation Administration allows zaleplon for pilots with a 12-hour wait period before flying and no more than twice a week, which makes it the sleep medication with the shortest allowed waiting period after use. The substances with the 2nd shortest period, which is of 24 hours, are zolpidem and ramelteon.

=== Military use ===
The United States Air Force uses zaleplon as one of the hypnotics approved as a "no-go pill" to help aviators and special-duty personnel sleep in support of mission readiness (with a four-hour restriction on subsequent flight operation). "Ground tests" are required prior to authorization being issued to use the medication in an operational situation. The other hypnotics used as "no-go pills" are temazepam and zolpidem, which both have longer mandatory recovery periods.
