= Zolpidem =

Sleep medication

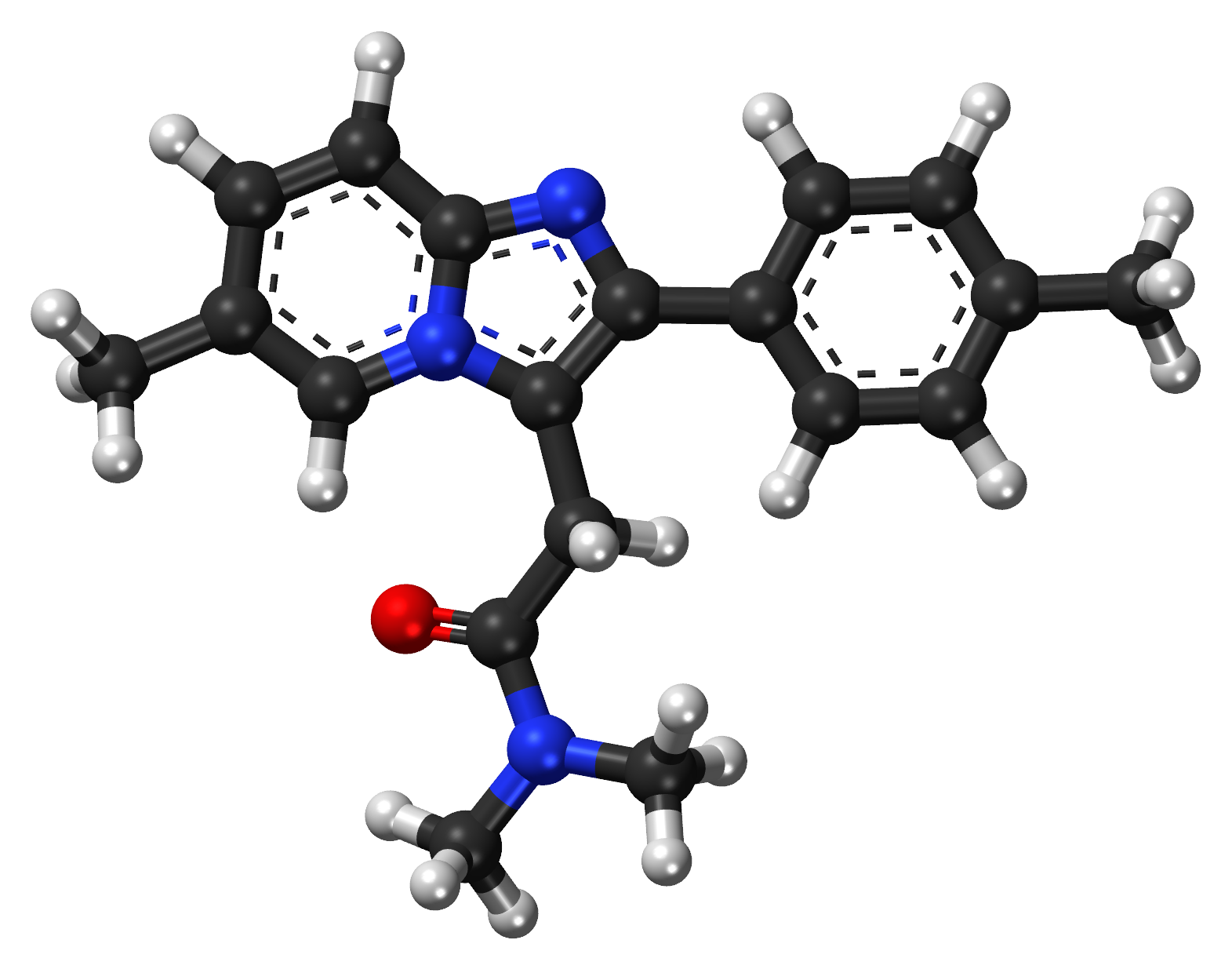

Clinical data
- Trade names: Ambien, others
- AHFS/Drugs.com: Monograph
- MedlinePlus: a693025
- License data: US DailyMed: Zolpidem
- Pregnancy category: AU: B3
- Dependence liability: Physical: High Psychological: Moderate
- Addiction liability: High
- Routes of administration: By mouth, sublingual, oromucosal (spray), rectal
- Drug class: Nonbenzodiazepine, sedative-hypnotic
- ATC code: N05CF02 (WHO)

Legal status
- Legal status: AU: S4 (Prescription only); BR: Class B1 (Psychoactive drugs); CA: Schedule IV; DE: Prescription only (Anlage III for higher doses); NZ: Class C5 (very rarely prescribed); UK: Class C; US: Schedule IV; UN: Psychotropic Schedule IV; SE: Förteckning IV In general: ℞ (Prescription only)

Pharmacokinetic data
- Bioavailability: 70% (by mouth)
- Protein binding: 92%
- Metabolism: Liver through CYP3A4 (~60%), CYP2C9 (~20%), and CYP1A2 (~14%)
- Metabolites: (ZCA) zolpidem 6-carboxylic acid; (ZPCA) zolpidem phenyl-4-carboxylic acid
- Onset of action: 15 minutes (oral spray); 30 minutes (oral tablets)
- Elimination half-life: 2–3 hours
- Duration of action: 3 hours (immediate release); 3–6 hours (extended release) (duration & elimination varies by gender & age)
- Excretion: Kidney (56%) fecal (34%)

Identifiers
- IUPAC name: N,N-Dimethyl-2-[6-methyl-2-(4-methylphenyl)imidazo[1,2-a]pyridin-3-yl]acetamide hemitartrate
- CAS Number: 82626-48-0
- PubChem CID: 5732
- IUPHAR/BPS: 4362
- DrugBank: DB00425
- ChemSpider: 5530
- UNII: 7K383OQI23
- KEGG: D08690
- ChEBI: CHEBI:10125
- ChEMBL: ChEMBL911
- CompTox Dashboard (EPA): DTXSID7045946
- ECHA InfoCard: 100.115.604

Chemical and physical data
- Formula: C_{19}H_{21}N_{3}O
- Molar mass: 307.397 g·mol^{−1}
- 3D model (JSmol): Interactive image
- Melting point: 193–197 °C (379–387 °F)
- SMILES: CN(C)C(=O)Cc1c(nc2ccc(C)cn12)c3ccc(C)cc3
- InChI: InChI=1S/C19H21N3O/c1-13-5-8-15(9-6-13)19-16(11-18(23)21(3)4)22-12-14(2)7-10-17(22)20-19/h5-10,12H,11H2,1-4H3; Key:ZAFYATHCZYHLPB-UHFFFAOYSA-N

Zolpidem, sold under the brand name Ambien among others, is a medication primarily used for the short-term treatment of sleeping problems. Guidelines recommend that it be used only after cognitive behavioral therapy for insomnia and after behavioral changes, such as sleep hygiene, have been tried. It decreases the time to sleep onset by about fifteen minutes and at larger doses helps people stay asleep longer. It is taken by mouth and is available as conventional tablets, extended-release tablets, or sublingual tablets.

Common side effects include daytime sleepiness, headache, nausea, and diarrhea. More severe side effects include memory problems and hallucinations. While flumazenil, a GABA_{A} receptor antagonist, can reverse zolpidem's effects, usually supportive care is all that is recommended in overdose.

Zolpidem is a nonbenzodiazepine, or Z-drug, which acts as a sedative and hypnotic as a positive allosteric modulator at the GABA_{A} receptor. It is an imidazopyridine and increases GABA effects in the central nervous system by binding to GABA_{A} receptors at the same location as benzodiazepines. It generally has a half-life of two to three hours. This, however, is increased in those with liver problems.

Zolpidem was approved for medical use in the United States in 1992. It became available as a generic medication in 2007. Zolpidem is a schedule IV controlled substance in the US under the Controlled Substances Act of 1970 (CSA). In 2023, it was the 54th most commonly prescribed medication in the United States, with more than 11 million prescriptions.

== Medical uses ==
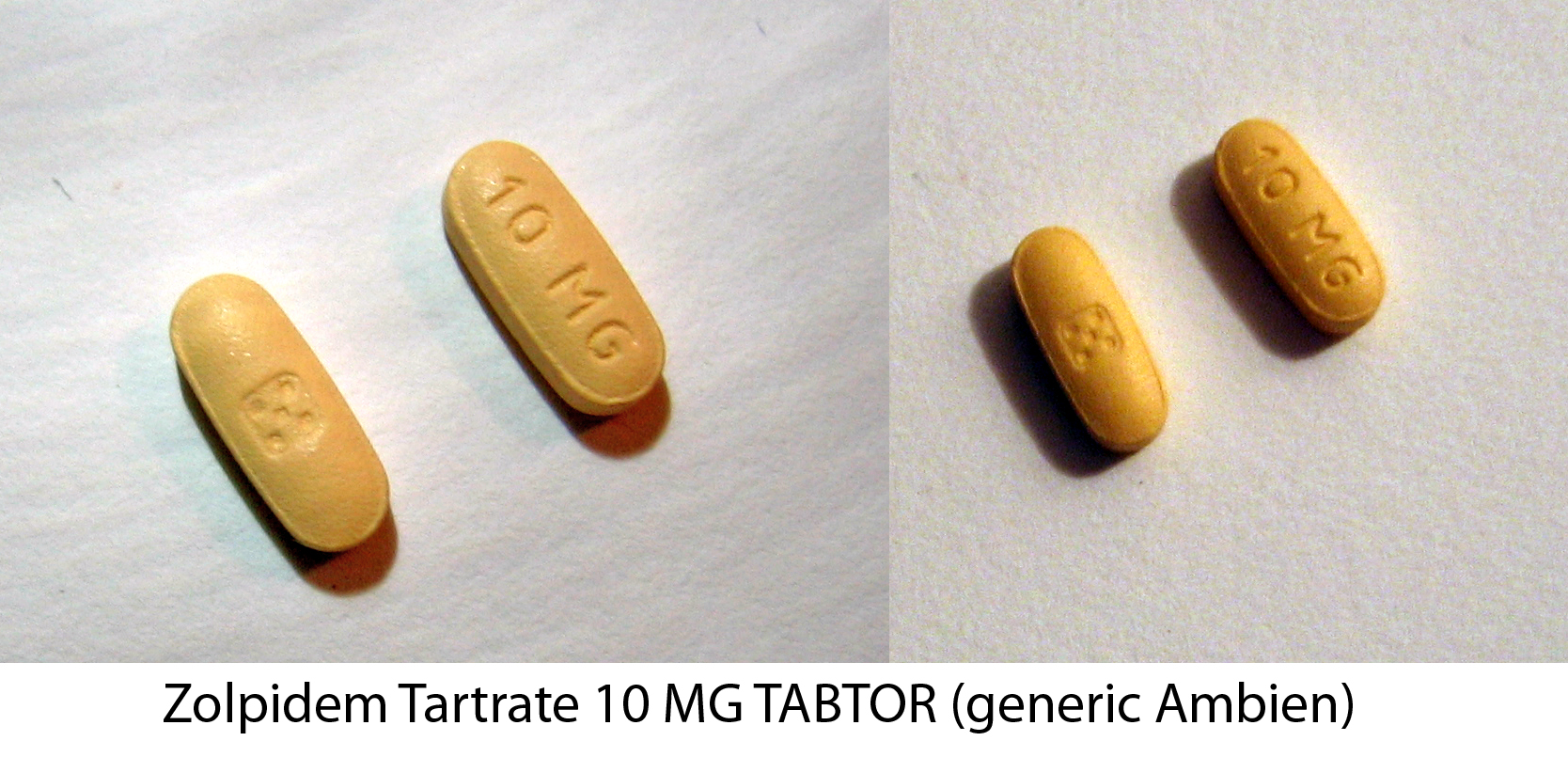
Generic zolpidem tartrate

Zolpidem is labeled for short-term (usually about two to six weeks) treatment of insomnia at the lowest possible dose. It may be used for both improving sleep onset, sleep onset latency, and staying asleep.

Guidelines from NICE, the European Sleep Research Society, and the American College of Physicians recommend medication for insomnia (including possible zolpidem) only as a second-line treatment after non-pharmacological treatment options have been tried (e.g. cognitive behavioral therapy for insomnia). This is based in part on a 2012 review which found that Zolpidem's effectiveness is nearly as much due to psychological effects as to the medication itself.

Increasingly, Zolpidem is being used off-label for the treatment of comatose or vegetative states for brain injuries originating outside of the brain stem. Additionally, it has been implicated in the treatment of aphasia after hypoxic stroke. While the full mechanism is unknown, GABA stimulation appears to create paradoxical excitement in the brain, leading to a gradual recovery of cognitive, speech, and motor function. As of 2026, the usage of Zolpidem for this purpose is scattered but has gradually increased since the breakthrough study published in 2007.

== Contraindications ==
Use of zolpidem may impair driving skills with a resultant increased risk of road traffic accidents. This adverse effect is not unique to zolpidem but also occurs with other hypnotic drugs. Caution should be exercised by motor vehicle drivers. The U.S. Food and Drug Administration (FDA) recommends lower doses of zolpidem due to impaired function the day after taking it.

Zolpidem should not be prescribed to older people, who are more sensitive to the effects of hypnotics including zolpidem, and are at an increased risk of falls and adverse cognitive effects, such as delirium and neurocognitive disorder.

Animal studies have revealed evidence of incomplete ossification and increased intrauterine fetal death at doses greater than seven times the maximum recommended human dose or higher; however, teratogenicity was not observed at any dose level. There are no controlled data on human pregnancy. In one case report, zolpidem was found in cord blood at delivery. Zolpidem is recommended for use during pregnancy only when the benefits outweigh the risks.

== Adverse effects ==
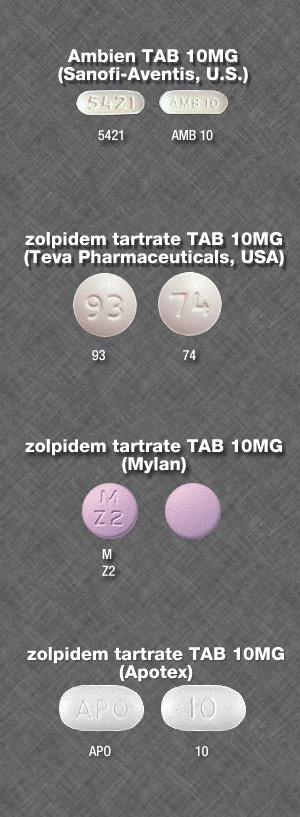
Various zolpidem pills

The most common adverse effects of short-term use include headache (reported by 7% of people in clinical trials), drowsiness (2%), dizziness (1%), and diarrhea (1%); the most common side effects of long-term use included drowsiness (8%), dizziness (5%), allergy (4%), sinusitis (4%), back pain (3%), diarrhea (3%), drugged feeling (3%), dry mouth (3%), lethargy (3%), sore throat (3%), abdominal pain (2%), constipation (2%), heart palpitations (2%), lightheadedness (2%), rash (2%), abnormal dreams (1%), amnesia (1%), chest pain (1%), depression (1%), flu-like symptoms (1%), and sleep disorder (1%).

Zolpidem increases the risk of depression, falls and bone fracture, poor driving, suppressed respiration and has been associated with an increased risk of death. Upper and lower respiratory infections are also common (experienced by 1–10% of people).

Residual 'hangover' effects, such as sleepiness and impaired psychomotor and cognitive function, may persist into the day following nighttime administration. Such effects may impair the ability of users to drive safely and increase risks of falls and hip fractures. In January 2013, the FDA issued a safety communication addressing next-morning cognitive impairment associated with the drug. In May 2013, the FDA recommended avoiding activities requiring alertness the day after using extended-release formulations.

=== Sleepwalking and complex sleep behaviors ===
Zolpidem is associated with complex sleep behaviors (CSBs), defined as activities performed during sleep followed by amnesia. These activities may include walking, driving, eating, having sex, having conversations, and performing other daily activities while asleep. Research by Australia's National Prescribing Service found these activities typically occur after the first dose or within a few days of starting therapy, although they may occur at any time during treatment.

Concerns regarding zolpidem-related CSBs have prompted actions by regulatory authorities, including Australia's Therapeutic Goods Administration (TGA) and the U.S. Food and Drug Administration (FDA). In February 2008, the TGA implemented a boxed warning for the drug. In April 2019, the FDA strengthened the drug's warning labeling by adding a black box warning highlighting the risk of serious injuries and fatalities related to CSBs, even at recommended doses and after single use, and added a contraindication advising against zolpidem use in patients with a history of CSBs.

=== Tolerance, dependence and withdrawal ===
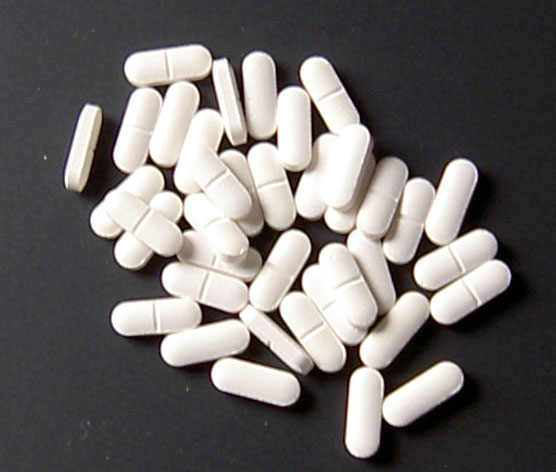
Ambien tablets

As zolpidem is associated with drug tolerance and substance dependence, its prescription guidelines are only for severe insomnia and short periods of use at the lowest effective dose. Tolerance to the effects of zolpidem can develop in some people in just a few weeks. Abrupt withdrawal may cause delirium, seizures, or other adverse effects, especially if used for prolonged periods and at high doses. When drug tolerance and physical dependence to zolpidem develop, treatment usually entails a gradual dose reduction over a period of months to minimize withdrawal symptoms, which can resemble those seen during benzodiazepine withdrawal.

Failing that, an alternative method may be necessary for some people, such as a switch to a benzodiazepine equivalent dose of a longer-acting benzodiazepine drug, as for diazepam or chlordiazepoxide, followed by a gradual reduction in dose of the long-acting benzodiazepine. In people who are difficult to treat, an inpatient flumazenil administration allows for rapid competitive binding of flumazenil to GABA_{A}–receptor as an antagonist, thus stopping (and effectively detoxifying) zolpidem from being able to bind as an agonist on GABA_{A}–receptor; slowly drug dependence or addiction to zolpidem will wane.

Alcoholics or recovering alcoholics may be at increased risk of physical dependency or abuse of zolpidem. It is not typically prescribed to people with a history of alcoholism, recreational drug use, physical dependency, or psychological dependency on sedative-hypnotic drugs. A 2014 review found evidence of drug-seeking behavior, with prescriptions for zolpidem making up 20% of falsified or forged prescriptions.

Rodent studies of the tolerance-inducing properties have shown that zolpidem has less tolerance-producing potential than benzodiazepines, but in primates, the tolerance-producing potential of zolpidem was the same as seen with benzodiazepines.

Zolpidem misuse has been associated with dependence and addiction, often driven by its euphoric effects. Reported cases include extremely high daily doses, sometimes up to 6,000 mg, with withdrawal symptoms such as seizures, tremors, delirium, and irritability. Management typically involves tapering or substitution with long-acting benzodiazepines, occasionally with flumazenil or cholinesterase inhibitors, alongside psychosocial therapies such as mindfulness-based cognitive therapy. While organ toxicity is rare, high doses can cause severe central nervous system effects.

=== Overdose ===
Overdose can lead to coma or death.

Zolpidem overdose can be treated with the GABA_{A} receptor antagonist flumazenil, which displaces zolpidem from its binding site on the GABA_{A} receptor to rapidly reverse the effects of the zolpidem.

=== Detection in body fluids ===
Zolpidem may be quantitated in blood or plasma to confirm a diagnosis of poisoning in people who are hospitalized, to provide evidence in an impaired driving arrest, or to assist in a medicolegal death investigation. Blood or plasma zolpidem concentrations are usually in a range of 30–300 μg/L in persons receiving the drug therapeutically, 100–700 μg/L in those arrested for impaired driving, and 1000–7000 μg/L in victims of acute overdosage. Analytical techniques, in general, involve gas or liquid chromatography.

== Pharmacology ==
Binding profile
Site	Ki (nM)
GABA_{A} Benzodiazepine Type I^{c}	25
GABA_{A} Benzodiazepine^{b}	26
GABA_{A} α_{1}	27
GABA_{A} α_{1}β_{1}γ_{2}	111.9
GABA_{A} α_{1}β_{3}γ_{2}	41
GABA_{A} α_{2}	160
GABA_{A} α_{2}β_{1}γ_{2}	760.6
GABA_{A} α_{2}β_{2}γ_{2}^{a}	765
GABA_{A} α_{3}	380
GABA_{A} α_{3}β_{1}γ_{2}	2149.5
GABA_{A} α_{4}β_{3}γ_{2}	> 10,000
GABA_{A} α_{5}β_{1}γ_{2}	> 10,000
GABA_{A} α_{6}β_{3}γ_{2}	> 10,000
Values are K_{i} (nM). The smaller the value, the more strongly the drug binds to the site. All values are for human receptors unless otherwise specified. ^{a}HEK293 ^{b}Rat's cerebral cortex. ^{c}Rat's hippocampus. Additional sources:

=== Mechanism of action ===
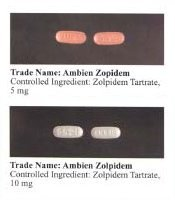

Zolpidem is a ligand of high-affinity positive modulator sites of GABA_{A} receptors, which enhances GABAergic inhibition of neurotransmission in the central nervous system. It selectively binds to α_{1} subunits of this pentameric ion channel. Accordingly, it has strong hypnotic properties and weak anxiolytic, myorelaxant, and anticonvulsant properties. Opposed to diazepam, zolpidem is able to bind to binary αβ GABA receptors, where it was shown to bind to the α1–α1 subunit interface. Zolpidem has about 10-fold lower affinity for the α_{2}- and α_{3}- subunits than for α_{1}, and no appreciable affinity for α_{5} subunit-containing receptors. ω_{1} type GABA_{A} receptors are the α_{1}-containing GABA_{A} receptors and are found primarily in the brain, the ω_{2} receptors are those that contain the α_{2}-, α_{3}-, α_{4}-, α_{5}-, or α_{6} subunits, and are found primarily in the spine. Thus, zolpidem favours binding to GABA_{A} receptors located in the brain rather than the spine. Zolpidem has no affinity for γ_{1} and γ_{3} subunit-containing receptors and, like the vast majority of benzodiazepine-like drugs, it lacks affinity for receptors containing α_{4} and α_{6}. Zolpidem modulates the receptor presumably by inducing a receptor conformation that enables an increased binding strength of the orthosteric agonist GABA towards its cognate receptor without affecting desensitization or peak currents.

Like zaleplon, zolpidem may increase slow-wave sleep but cause no effect on stage 2 sleep.

A 2004 meta-analysis compared benzodiazepines against nonbenzodiazepines and showed few consistent differences between zolpidem and benzodiazepines in terms of sleep onset latency, total sleep duration, number of awakenings, quality of sleep, adverse events, tolerance, rebound insomnia, and daytime alertness.

=== Pharmacokinetics ===
Microsome studies indicate zolpidem is metabolized by CYP3A4 (61%) CYP2C9 (22%), CYP1A2 (14%), CYP2D6 (<3%), and CYP2C19 (<3%). Less than 1% is excreted in urine unchanged. It is principally metabolized into three metabolites, none of which are believed to be pharmacologically active. The absolute bioavailability of zolpidem is about 70%. The drug reaches peak concentration in about 2 hours and has a half-life in healthy adults of about 2–3 hours. Zolpidem's half life is decreased in children and increased in the elderly and people with liver issues. While some studies show men metabolize zolpidem faster than women (possibly due to testosterone), others do not. A review found only a 33% lower clearance in women compared to men, suggesting the FDA's dosage reduction of 50% for women may have been too large.

== Interactions ==
People should not consume alcohol or use opioids while using Zolpidem. Use of opioids with zolpidem increases the risk of respiratory depression and death. The U.S. Food and Drug Administration (FDA) is advising that the opioid addiction medications buprenorphine and methadone should not be withheld from patients taking benzodiazepines or other drugs that depress the central nervous system (CNS).

Next day sedation can be worsened if people take zolpidem while they are also taking antipsychotics, other sedatives, anxiolytics, antidepressants, anticonvulsants, and antihistamines. Some people taking antidepressants have had visual hallucinations when they also took zolpidem.

Cytochrome P450 inhibitors, particularly CYP3A4 and CYP1A2 inhibitors such as fluvoxamine, ciprofloxacin, and clarithromycin will increase the effects of a given dose of zolpidem. Cytochrome P450 activators like St. John's Wort may decrease the activity of zolpidem. One study found that caffeine increases the concentration over time curve of zolpidem by about 20% and furthermore found that caffeine cannot adequately compensate for the impaired cognition caused by zolpidem. Other studies show no effect of caffeine on zolpidem metabolism.

== Chemistry ==
Three chemical syntheses of zolpidem are common. 4-Methylacetophenone is first brominated and that product is treated with 2-amino-5-methylpyridine to give the imidazopyridine. From here the reactions use a variety of reagents to complete the synthesis, either involving thionyl chloride or sodium cyanide. These reagents are challenging to handle and require thorough safety assessments. Though such safety procedures are common in the industry, they make clandestine manufacture difficult.

Several major side-products of the sodium cyanide reaction have been characterised and include dimers and mannich products.

Alpidem is also an imidazopyridine and is an analogue of zolpidem. Both agents are GABA_{A} receptor positive allosteric modulators. However, whereas zolpidem is used as a hypnotic and sedative, alpidem was used as an anxiolytic.

== History ==
In 1978, chemists Jean-Pierre Kaplan and Pascal George began developing a non-benzodiazepine sedative at the French pharmaceutical firm Synthélabo after a colleague suggested developing a molecule similar to zopiclone. Kaplan and George began examining traits of benzodiazepines, zopiclone, and LSD by building wooden models of vairous molocelues to try to develop the new sedative. They worked through several early groups of compounds before George produced a third group that appeared promising during animal testing. Synthélabo filed for a French patent on 77 compounds in October 1980 without publicly singling out the standout compound that became zolpidem and then filed a similar US patent in 1981. Synthélabo launched zolpidem in Europe beginning in 1988. Synthélabo and Searle collaborated to bring it to market in the US, and it was approved in the United States in 1992 under the brand name "Ambien". It became available as a generic medication in 2007. A controlled-release formulation of zolpidem, Ambien CR, was approved in 2005.

In 2015, the American Geriatrics Society said that zolpidem, eszopiclone, and zaleplon met the Beers criteria and should be avoided in individuals 65 and over "because of their association with harms balanced with their minimal efficacy in treating insomnia." The AGS stated the strength of the recommendation that older adults avoid zolpidem is "strong" and the quality of evidence supporting it is "moderate."

== Society and culture ==
Prescriptions in the US for all sleeping pills (including zolpidem) steadily declined from around 57 million tablets in 2013, to around 47 million in 2017, possibly due to concern about prescribing addictive drugs amid the opioid crisis.

=== Military use ===
As of 2012, the United States Air Force used zolpidem as one of the hypnotics approved as a "no-go pill" with a six-hour restriction on subsequent flight operation to help aviators and special duty personnel sleep in support of mission readiness. (The other hypnotics used are temazepam and zaleplon.) "Ground tests" are required before an authorization is issued to use the medication in an operational situation.

=== Recreational use ===
Zolpidem has potential for medical misuse when the drug is continued long term without or against medical advice, or for recreational use when the drug is taken to achieve a "high". The transition from medical use of zolpidem to high-dose addiction or drug dependence can occur with use, but some believe it may be more likely when used without a clinical recommendation to continue using it, when physiological drug tolerance leads to higher doses than the usual 5 mg or 10 mg, when consumed through insufflation or injection, or when taken for purposes other than as a sleep aid. Recreational use is more prevalent in those having been dependent on other drugs in the past, but tolerance and drug dependence can still sometimes occur in those without a history of drug dependence. Chronic users of high doses are more likely to develop physical dependence on the drug, which may cause severe withdrawal symptoms, including seizures if abrupt withdrawal from zolpidem occurs.

Other drugs, including benzodiazepines and zopiclone, are also found in high numbers of suspected drugged drivers. Many drivers have blood levels far exceeding the therapeutic dose range, suggesting a high degree of excessive-use potential for benzodiazepines, zolpidem, and zopiclone. U.S. Congressman Patrick J. Kennedy says that he was using zolpidem (Ambien) and promethazine (Phenergan) when he was caught driving erratically at 3 a.m. "I simply do not remember getting out of bed, being pulled over by the police, or being cited for three driving infractions," Kennedy said.

As of 2009, nonmedical use of zolpidem is common for some adolescents. Some users have reported decreased anxiety, mild euphoria, perceptual changes, visual distortions, and hallucinations. Zolpidem was used by Australian Olympic swimmers at the London Olympics in 2012, leading to controversy.

=== International travel ===
Zolpidem is among the agents used in the short-term management of insomnia associated with jet lag, typically at doses of 5–10 mg. Its clinical use, similar to that of other hypnotics, is constrained by the potential for adverse effects and dependence, and guidelines generally recommend limiting treatment duration to short periods, usually under one week.

=== Regulation ===
For the stated reason of its potential for recreational use and dependence, zolpidem (along with the other benzodiazepine-like Z-drugs) is a schedule IV substance under the Controlled Substances Act in the US. The United States patent for zolpidem was held by the French pharmaceutical corporation Sanofi-Aventis.

=== Use in crime ===
The Z-drugs, including zolpidem, have been used as date rape drugs. Zolpidem is available by prescription, and broadly prescribed unlike other date rape drugs: gamma-hydroxybutyrate (GHB), which is used to treat narcolepsy, or flunitrazepam (Rohypnol), which is only prescribed as a second-line choice for insomnia. Zolpidem can be detected in bodily fluids for 36 hours, though it may be possible to detect it by hair testing much later, which is due to the short elimination half-life of 2.5–3 hours. This use of the drug was highlighted during proceedings against Darren Sharper, who was accused of using the tablets he was prescribed to facilitate a series of rapes.

=== Sleepwalking and complex sleep behaviors ===
Zolpidem has drawn significant media attention due to reports of complex sleep behaviors (CSBs), including sleepwalking, sleep-driving, and other activities performed while not fully conscious. Notable incidents include media reports in the United States concerning events such as Congressman Patrick Kennedy's motor vehicle accident and in Australia following a fatal 20 metres (66 ft) fall from the Sydney Harbour Bridge involving an individual reportedly under the influence of zolpidem. In October 2010, actor Charlie Sheen blamed a rampage in a New York City hotel room on an adverse reaction to zolpidem.

In May 2018, actress Roseanne Barr attributed a controversial remark on Twitter to the effects of zolpidem. Barr's tweet compared Valerie Jarrett, a Black woman and former advisor to Barack Obama, to an ape. The comparison sparked widespread condemnation and led to the cancellation of Roseanne. The incident prompted Sanofi, the manufacturer of Ambien, to issue a public statement clarifying that "racism is not a known side effect" of the medication.

=== Brand names ===
As of September 2018, zolpidem is marketed under many brands, examples include: Ambien 5 mg & 10 mg (IR oral tablets), Ambien CR 6.25 mg & 12.5 mg (controlled release tablets), Edluar 5 mg & 10 mg (sublingual tablets), Intermezzo 1.75 mg & 3.5 mg (sublingual tablets), and ZolpiMist 5 mg (oral spray).

== Research ==
While cases of zolpidem improving aphasia in people with stroke have been described, use for this purpose has unclear benefits. Zolpidem has also been studied in persistent vegetative states with unclear effect. A 2017 systematic review concluded that while there is preliminary evidence of benefit for treating disorders of movement and consciousness other than insomnia (including Parkinson's disease), more research is needed.

Animal studies in FDA files for zolpidem showed a dose dependent increase in some types of tumors, although the studies were too small to reach statistical significance. Some observational epidemiological studies have found a correlation between use of benzodiazepines and certain hypnotics including zolpidem and an increased risk of getting cancer, but others have found no correlation; a 2017 meta-analysis of such studies found a correlation, stating that use of hypnotics was associated with a 29% increased risk of cancer, and that "zolpidem use showed the strongest risk of cancer" with an estimated 34% increased risk, but noted that the results were tentative because some of the studies failed to control for confounders like cigarette smoking and alcohol use, and some of the studies analyzed were case–controls, which are more prone to some forms of bias. Similarly, a meta-analysis of benzodiazepine drugs also shows their use is associated with increased risk of cancer.
