= Pentameric protein =

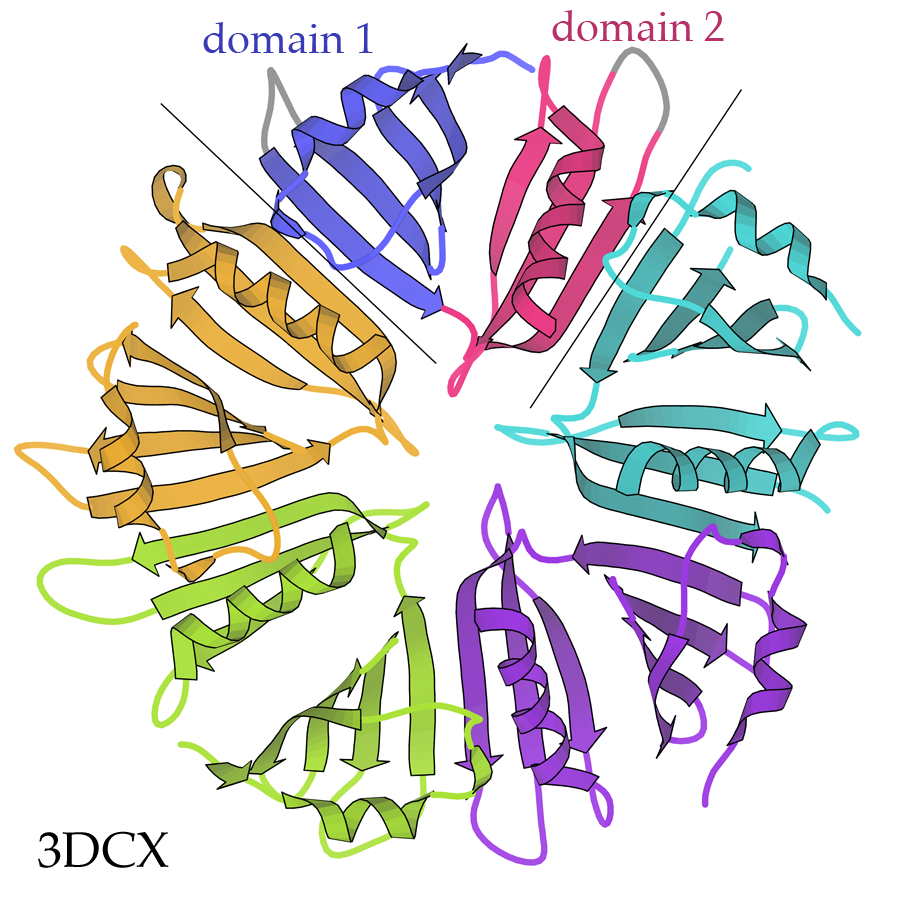
General structure of pentameric protein

A pentameric protein is a quaternary protein structure that consists of five protein subunits.

If all subunits are identical, the protein in a homopentamer. If at least one subunit is different, the protein in a heteropentamer.

== Examples ==
=== Ligand-gated ion channels ===
Five sub-units come together to form a channel. Each channel consist of two alpha chain, one beta, one gamma and one delta chain. These five chains assemble together (along with certain receptors like protons or acetylcholine) forming the structure of the channel. A ligand-gated ion channel on the post-synaptic junction of the muscle end-plate is an example of such a channel. They are acetylcholine-operated ion channels, which means that acetylcholine brings about a conformational change. The channel allows the free movement of the cations like Na^{+} and K^{+} when acetylcholine binds to its receptors.

=== Viral capsids ===
Many viral capsids are formed by hexameric and pentameric proteins. Such capsids are assigned a triangulation number (T-number) which describe relation between the number of pentagons and hexagons.

=== Carboxysomes ===
Protein enclosing bacterial organelles carboxysome is also made up of pentameric protein.

=== Major histocompatibility complex (MHC) pentamers ===
Synthetic pentameric proteins include MHC pentamers, a type of MHC multimer, comprising five peptide-MHC complexes associated via a coiled-coil domain, attached to five fluorophore moieties. These proteins are used as reagents in immunology research.

== See also ==
- Pentamer
