= GABRA4 =

Protein-coding gene in humans

Identifiers
- Aliases: GABRA4, gamma-aminobutyric acid type A receptor alpha4 subunit, gamma-aminobutyric acid type A receptor subunit alpha4
- External IDs: OMIM: 137141; MGI: 95616; GeneCards: GABRA4

Gene location (Human)
| Chr. | Chromosome 4 (human) |
| Band | 4p12 | Start | 46,918,900 bp |
| Band | 4p12 | End | 46,993,581 bp |

Gene location (Mouse)
| Chr. | Chromosome 5 (mouse) |
| Band | 5|5 C3.1-C3.2 | Start | 71,569,749 bp |
| Band | 5|5 C3.1-C3.2 | End | 71,658,308 bp |
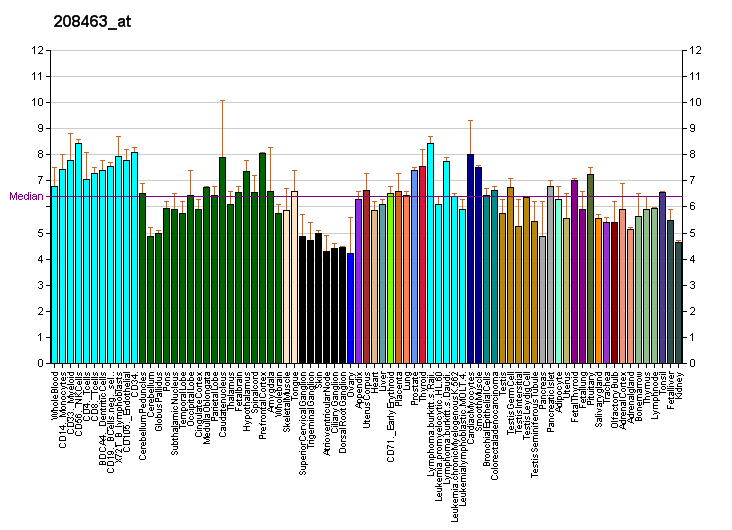
RNA expression pattern
| Bgee | Human / Mouse (ortholog); Top expressed in: postcentral gyrus; entorhinal cortex; buccal mucosa cell; superior frontal gyrus; middle temporal gyrus; Brodmann area 23; lateral nuclear group of thalamus; nucleus accumbens; endothelial cell; caudate nucleus / Top expressed in: lateral geniculate nucleus; medial dorsal nucleus; medial geniculate nucleus; olfactory tubercle; primary motor cortex; cingulate gyrus; piriform cortex; anterior amygdaloid area; nucleus accumbens; globus pallidus; More reference expression data |
| BioGPS | More reference expression data |
Gene ontology
| Molecular function | ion channel activity; benzodiazepine receptor activity; chloride channel activity; extracellular ligand-gated ion channel activity; GABA-A receptor activity; transmembrane signaling receptor activity; inhibitory extracellular ligand-gated ion channel activity; GABA-gated chloride ion channel activity; transmitter-gated ion channel activity involved in regulation of postsynaptic membrane potential |
| Cellular component | integral component of membrane; GABA-A receptor complex; postsynaptic membrane; membrane; synapse; integral component of plasma membrane; chloride channel complex; cell junction; plasma membrane; GABA-ergic synapse; integral component of postsynaptic specialization membrane; dendrite membrane; neuron projection; postsynapse |
| Biological process | gamma-aminobutyric acid signaling pathway; chloride transmembrane transport; ion transport; regulation of response to drug; central nervous system development; chloride transport; ion transmembrane transport; signal transduction; chemical synaptic transmission; regulation of membrane potential; nervous system process; synaptic transmission, GABAergic; regulation of postsynaptic membrane potential |
Sources:Amigo / QuickGO
Orthologs
| Databases | NCBI: entry; OMA: entry |
| Species | Human | Mouse |
| Entrez | 2557 | 14397 |
| Ensembl | ENSG00000109158 | ENSMUSG00000029211 |
| UniProt | P48169 | Q9D6F4 |
| RefSeq (mRNA) | NM_000809; NM_001204266; NM_001204267 | NM_010251 |
| RefSeq (protein) | NP_000800; NP_001191195; NP_001191196 | NP_034381; NP_001345970; NP_001345972; NP_001345973; NP_001345974 NP_001345975; NP_001345976; NP_001345977; NP_001345979 |
| Location (UCSC) | Chr 4: 46.92 – 46.99 Mb | Chr 5: 71.57 – 71.66 Mb |
| PubMed search |
- Wikidata
| View/Edit Human | View/Edit Mouse |

Gamma-aminobutyric acid receptor subunit alpha-4 is a protein that in humans is encoded by the GABRA4 gene.

GABA is the major inhibitory neurotransmitter in the mammalian brain where it acts at GABA-A receptors, which are ligand-gated chloride channels. Chloride conductance of these channels can be modulated by agents such as benzodiazepines that bind to the GABA-A receptor. At least 16 distinct subunits of GABA-A receptors have been identified.

== Research ==
A study in mice compared wild-type animals with those lacking the GABRA4 gene. GABRA4 knockout mice exhibited behavioral alterations relative to wild-type controls, including enhanced performance in spatial learning tasks and reduced social interaction, features that have been described as relevant to autism spectrum disorder–associated phenotypes in animal models. Transcriptomic analysis of hippocampal tissue from knockout mice identified altered gene expression consistent with increased activity of N-methyl-D-aspartate (NMDA) receptor–related signaling pathways, which are involved in synaptic plasticity, learning, and neuronal excitability.

== See also ==
- GABA_{A} receptor
