= Transoral incisionless fundoplication =

- Specialty: Gastroenterology

Transoral incisionless fundoplication (TIF) is an endoscope treatment designed to relieve symptoms of gastroesophageal reflux disease (GERD). The TIF procedure, similar to Nissen fundoplication, alleviates GERD symptoms by wrapping a portion of the stomach around the esophagus.

The TIF procedure, unlike laparoscopic fundoplication, does not require surgical incisions. Instead a surgical device (called the EsophyX) is inserted into the mouth, passed through the throat, and into the stomach. An endoscope is utilized to perform the procedure.

A minority of individuals who undergo the TIF procedure also require a hiatal hernia repair operation. The procedure is performed while the person is under general anesthesia and is typically an outpatient procedure.

== Medical use ==
Transoral incisionless fundoplication may improve symptoms in gastroesophageal reflux disease, at least in the short term. Benefits from the TIF procedure may last for up to 6 years.

== Complications ==
The risk of severe complications is 2.4%. About 1 in 30 people have major complications from the procedure.

== History ==
The device utilized to perform the procedure, called EsophyX, was developed by EndoGastric Solutions. The first TIF procedure utilizing the device was performed in 2005. The device received European Union CE mark in 2006 and United States Food and Drug Administration issued initial 510(k) clearance in 2007.

In February 2015, the American Medical Association's CPT Editorial Panel reviewed whether to create a new category 1 current procedural terminology (CPT) code for the TIF procedure. In January 2016, a unique code for the transoral incisionless fundoplication procedure was created and implemented.

As of 2016, more than 17,000 TIF procedures had been performed.

In July 2016, Health Care Service Corporation (HCSC) became the first United States health insurance company to add the TIF procedure to their medical coverage policy. HSCS added the TIF procedure to their health insurance policy at the recommendation of both the American Gastroenterological Association (AGA) and The Society of American Gastrointestinal and Endoscopic Surgeons (SAGES).

== Other options ==
The TIF procedure is not the ideal GERD solution for all people. Other medical and endoscopic treatments to alleviate GERD symptoms include: Stretta procedure and proton-pump inhibitors (PPIs).
