= Roemheld syndrome =

- Other names: Roemheld–Techlenburg–Ceconi syndrome Gastric-cardia; Gastrocardiac Syndrome
- Specialty: Gastroenterology/Cardiology

Roemheld syndrome (RS), or gastrocardiac syndrome, or gastric cardiac syndrome or Roemheld–Techlenburg–Ceconi syndrome or gastric-cardia, is a medical syndrome coined by Ludwig von Roemheld (1871–1938) describing a cluster of cardiovascular symptoms stimulated by gastrointestinal changes. Although it is a previously overlooked medical diagnosis, recent studies have described similar clinical presentations and highlighted potential underlying mechanisms.

== Symptoms and signs ==
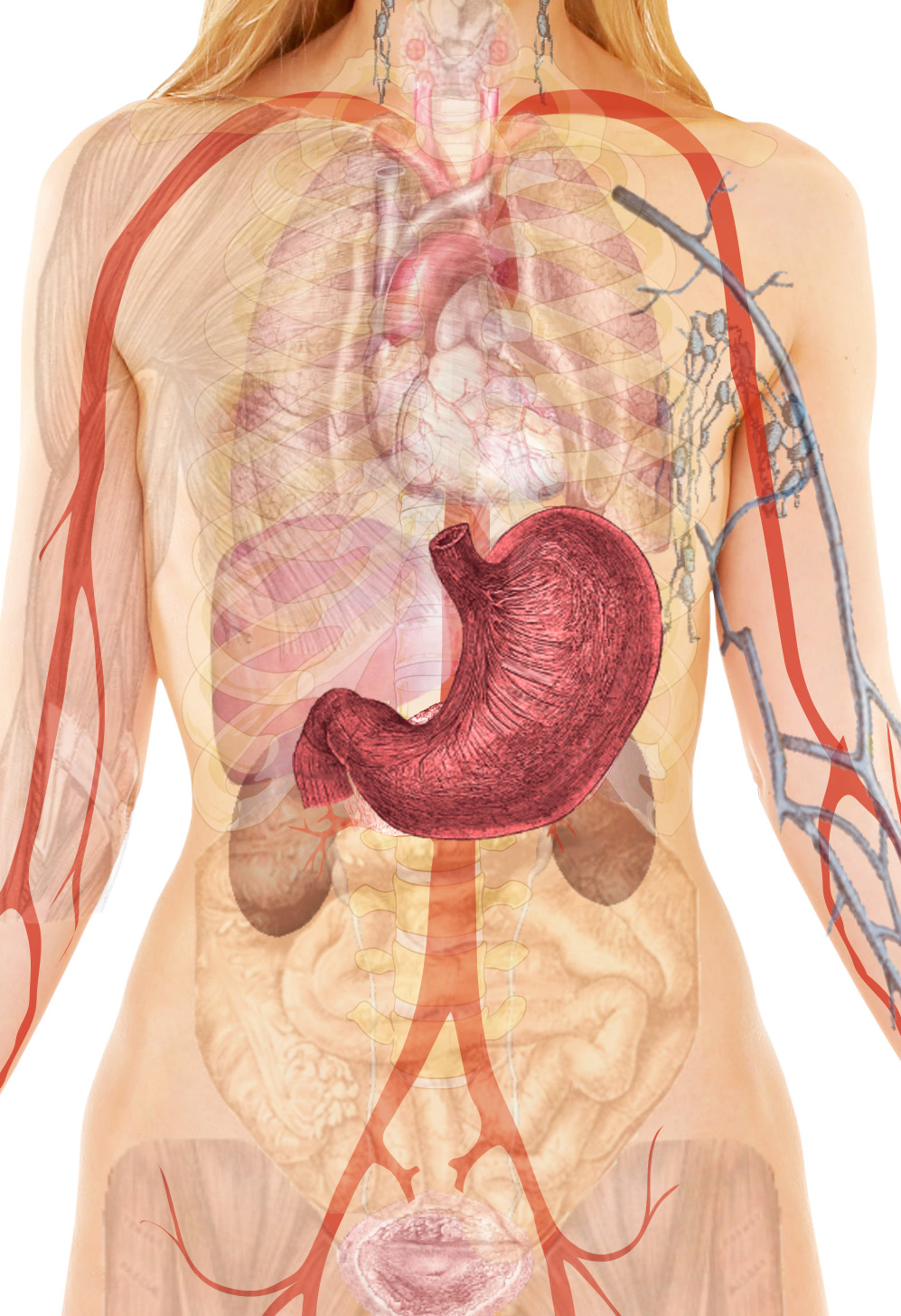
Relative position of the heart and stomach in the human body

Symptoms can be as follows. They are periodic, and occur only during an "episode", usually after eating.

- Sinus bradycardia
- Difficulty inhaling
- Angina pectoris
- Left ventricular discomfort
- Premature heart beats (PVC / PAC)
- Tachycardia
- Fatigue
- Anxiety
- Uncomfortable breathing
- Poor perfusion
- Muscle pain (crampiness)
- Burst or sustained vertigo or dizziness
- Sleep disturbance (particularly when sleeping within a few hours of eating, or lying on the left side)
- Hot flashes

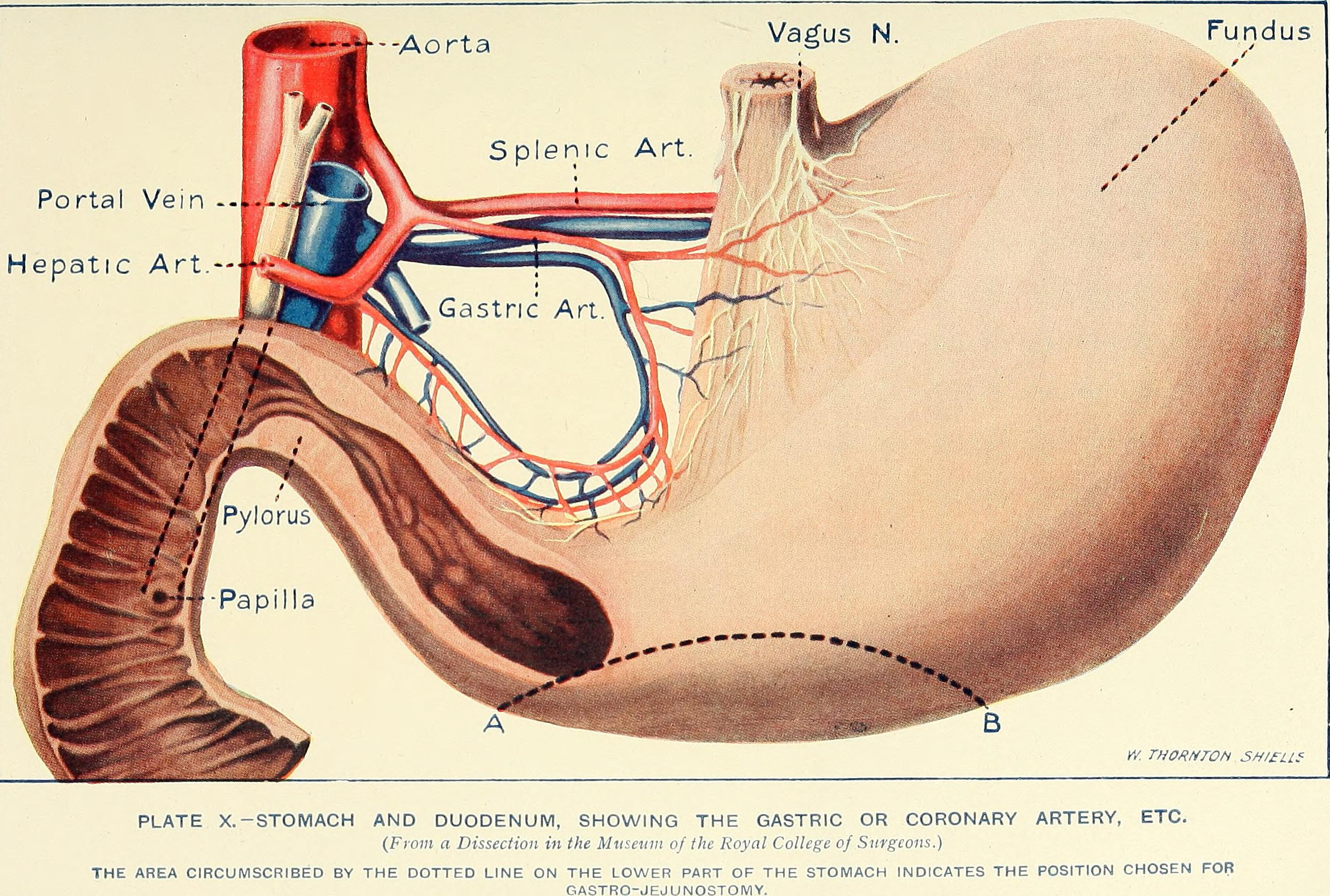
Human stomach with fundus part visible and Vagus nerve

=== Mechanical ===
Mechanically induced Roemheld syndrome is characterized by pressure in the epigastric and left hypochondriac region. Often the pressure is in the fundus of the stomach, the esophagus or distention of the bowel. It is believed this leads to elevation of the diaphragm, and secondary displacement of the heart. This reduces the ability of the heart to fill and increases the contractility of the heart to maintain homeostasis.

=== Neurological ===
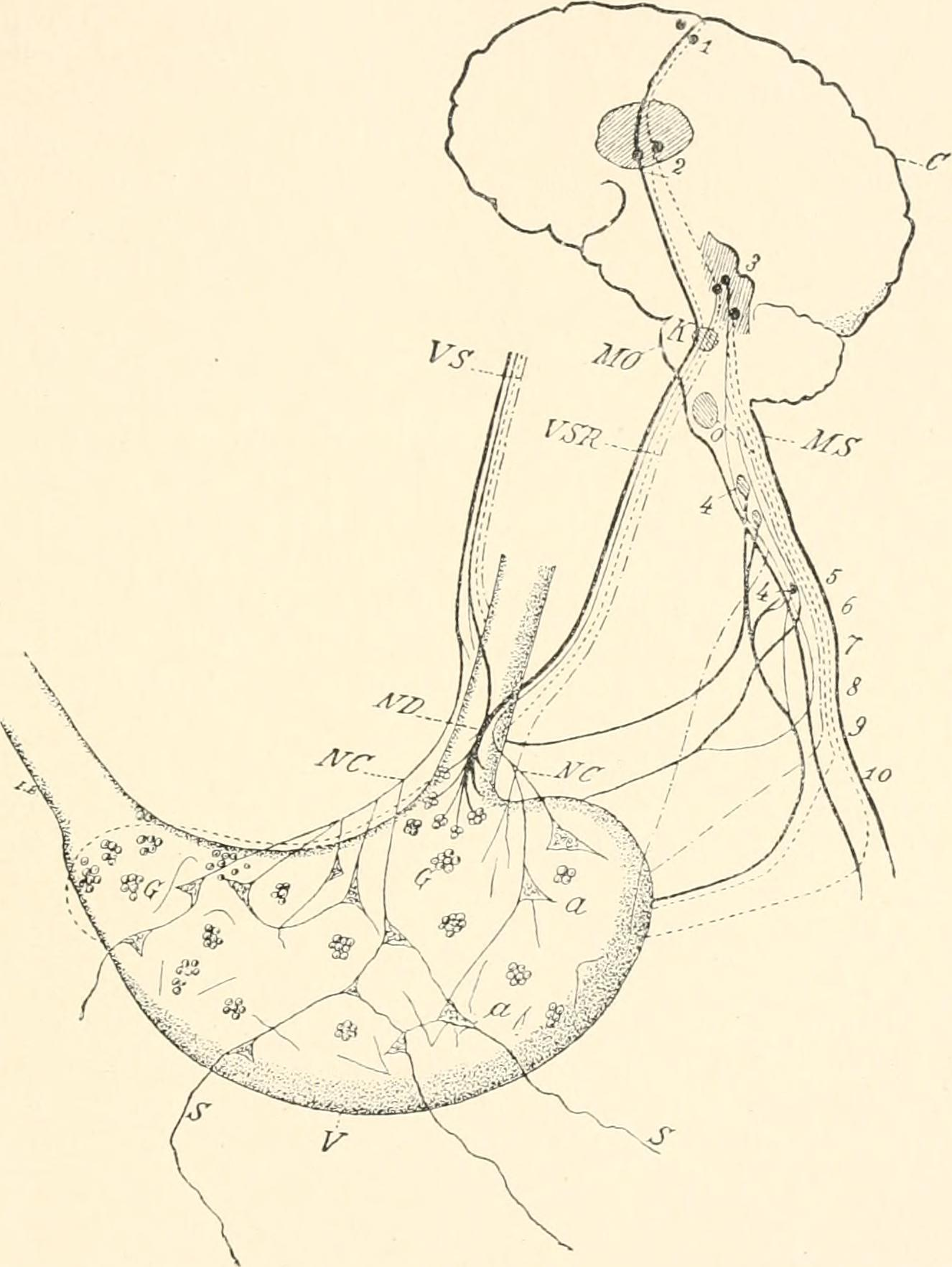
Gastric nerve connections to the spinal cord and brain medulla oblongata, which regulate the movements of the stomach

The cranium dysfunction mechanical changes in the gut can compress the vagus nerve at any number of locations along the vagus, slowing the heart. As the heart slows, autonomic reflexes are triggered to increase blood pressure and heart rate.

This is complemented by gastro-coronary reflexes whereby the coronary arteries constrict with "functional cardiovascular symptoms" similar to chest-pain on the left side and radiation to the left shoulder, dyspnea, sweating, up to angina pectoris-like attacks with extrasystoles, drop of blood pressure, and tachycardia (high heart rate) or sinus bradycardia (heart rate below 60 bpm). Typically, there are no changes/abnormalities related in the EKG detected. This can actually trigger a heart attack in people with cardiac structural abnormalities i.e. coronary bridge, missing coronary, and atherosclerosis.

If the heart rate drops too low for too long, catecholamines are released to counteract any lowering of blood pressure. Catecholamines bind to alpha receptors and beta receptors, decreasing vasodilation and increasing contractility of the heart. Sustaining this state causes heart fatigue which can lead to a decline in systolic and diastolic function, resulting in fatigue and chest pain.

== Causes ==
- Gastroesophageal reflux disease (GERD)
- Excessive gas in the transverse colon caused by:
  - Lactose intolerance
- Abnormal gallbladder function and/or blood flow
- Gall stones
- Sphincter of Oddi dysfunction
- Hiatal hernia
- Cardiac bridge (Coronary occluding reflexes triggered by coronary reflexes)
- Enteric disease
- Aneructonia, the inability to belch (continuous or intermittent), also referred to as retrograde cricopharyngeus dysfunction (R-CPD)
- Bowel obstruction (Less common, this usually leads to intense pain in short time)
- Acute pancreatic necrosis
- Eosinophilia

== Diagnosis ==
There is significant scope of misdiagnosis of Roemheld syndrome. Diagnosis of Roemheld syndrome usually begins with a cardiac workup, as the gastric symptoms may go unnoticed, and the cardiac symptoms are frightening and can be quite severe. After an EKG, Holter monitor, tilt table test, cardiac MRI, cardiac CT, heart catheterization, electrophysiology study, echocardiogram, and extensive blood work, and possibly a sleep study, a cardiologist may rule out a heart condition.

Often a psychiatric evaluation may follow, as conversion disorder may be suspected in the absence of heart disease or structural heart abnormalities.

In the absence of heart abnormalities, the diagnosis is often made on the basis of symptoms. A gastroenterologist will perform a colonoscopy, endoscopy, and abdominal ultrasound to locate or rule out problems in the abdomen.

Determining the cause of Roemheld syndrome is still not an exact science. If an ultrasound or sleep study is considered, the patient has to be able to trigger the symptoms, as it is difficult to detect any abnormalities when symptoms have subsided.

== Treatment ==
Treatment of the primary gastroenterological distress is the first concern, mitigation of gastric symptoms will also alleviate cardiac distress.

- Anticholinergics, magnesium, or sodium (to raise blood pressure) supplements
- Anticonvulsants have eliminated all symptoms in some Roemheld syndrome sufferers; Lorazepam, Oxcarbazepine increase GI motility, reduce vagus "noise" (sodium channel blocking believed to contribute to positive effects)
- Alpha blockers may increase GI motility if that is an issue, also 5 mg to 10 mg amitriptyline if motility is an issue that can't be solved by other methods
- Antigas - simethicone, beano, omnimax reduces epigastric pressure
- Antacids - calcium carbonate, famotidine, omeprazole, etc. reduces acid reflux in the case of hiatal hernia or other esophageal type Roemheld syndrome.
- Vagotomy, a surgical procedure that involves removing part of the vagus nerve.
- Beta blockers - reduces contractility and automaticity of the heart which reduces irregular rhythms but also lowers blood pressure when symptoms occur, and further reduces perfusion ex: Carvedilol, this will control abnormal heart rhythms, but can precipitate Prinzmetal angina and heart block.

== Etiology ==
Roemheld syndrome is characterized strictly by abdominal maladies triggering reflexes in the heart. There are a number of pathways through which cardiac reflexes can occur: hormones, mechanical, neurological and immunological.

== History ==
Ludwig Roemheld characterized this particular syndrome shortly before his death; one of his research topics around this time was the effects of calorie intake on the heart. In Elsevier publications, there is no current research or publishing under the name Roemheld syndrome, and as a result, many cases go undiagnosed. German publishing on the subject remains untranslated as of 2009.

== See also ==
- Swallowing syncope
- Retrograde cricopharyngeus dysfunction
