= Impedance–pH monitoring =

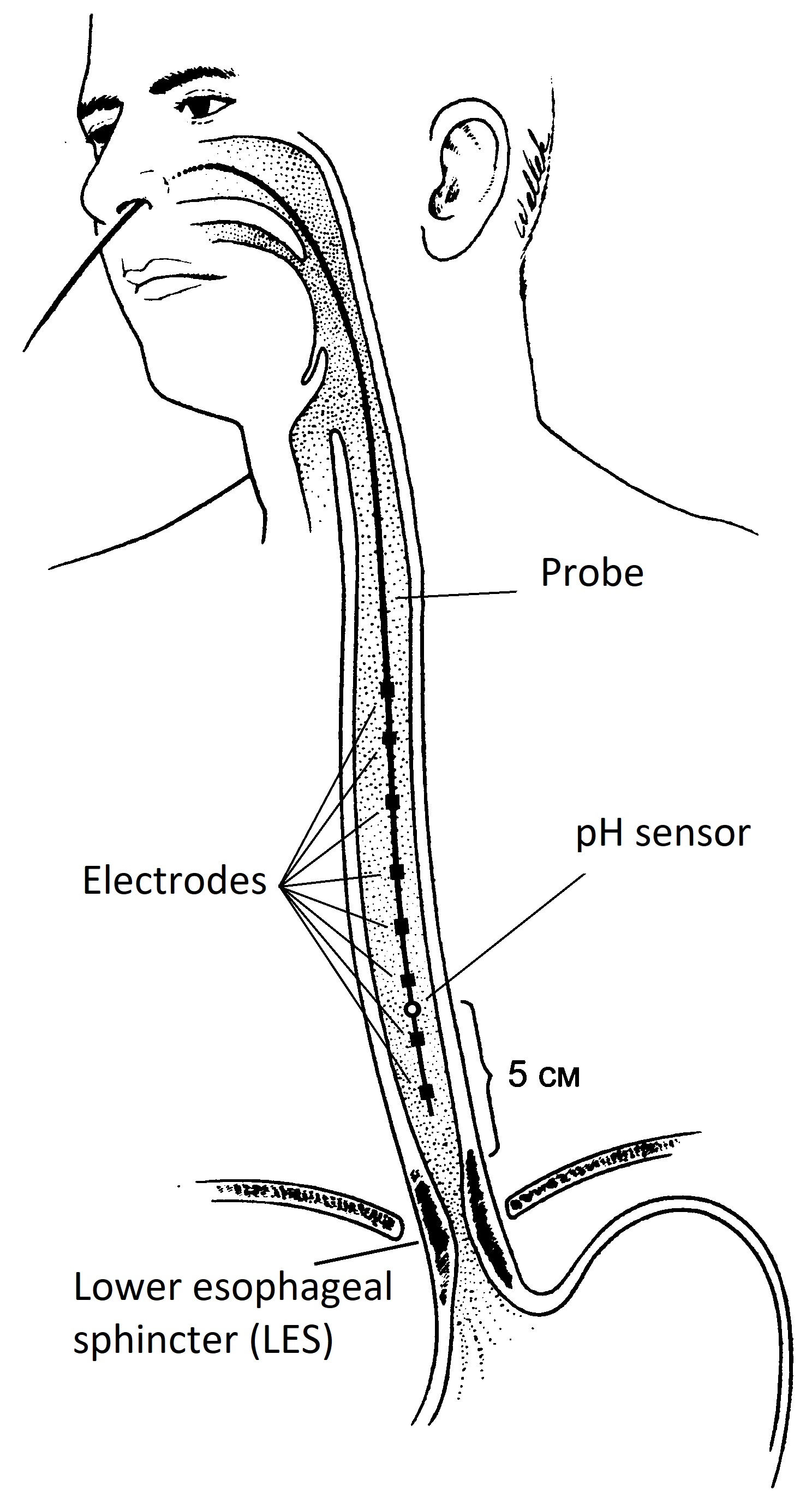
- Illustration of impedance–pH monitoring
- Purpose: diagnosis of gastroesophageal reflux disease

Impedance–pH monitoring is a technique used in the diagnosis of gastroesophageal reflux disease (GERD), by monitoring both impedance and pH.

Patients with ongoing symptoms while on proton-pump inhibitor (PPI) therapy are commonly diagnosed with impedance–pH monitoring while continuing their medications. The impedance–pH monitoring diagnostic test determines the frequency of reflux episodes and the time relationship of reflux episodes and symptoms. The impedance–pH monitoring test determines if the patient's symptoms are related to acid reflux, related to nonacid reflux, or not related to reflux of any type. A positive GERD diagnosis is made if acid or nonacid reflux precedes symptoms in a statistically meaningful manner. Patients with a positive impedance–pH monitoring test may benefit from acid-reduction therapy such as fundoplication surgery or endoscopic fundoplication techniques.

== See also ==
- Esophageal pH monitoring
