= Rudolph Nissen =

German-Swiss surgeon (1896–1981)

- Born: September 5, 1896; Neisse, German Empire
- Died: January 22, 1981 (aged 84); Riehen, Switzerland
- Known for: Nissen fundoplication
- Scientific career
- Fields: General surgery

Signature
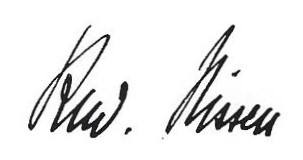

Rudolph Nissen (sometimes spelled Rudolf Nissen) (5 September 1896 – 22 January 1981) was a German surgeon who chaired surgery departments in Turkey, the United States and Switzerland. The Nissen fundoplication, a surgical procedure for the treatment of gastroesophageal reflux disease, is named after him.

Nissen trained under German physicians Ludwig Aschoff and Ferdinand Sauerbruch. He completed the first pneumonectomy in 1931. In 1948, he performed an abdominal surgery that extended the life of Albert Einstein by several years. Nissen wrote an autobiography published at Deutsche Verlags-Anstalt in 1969 called "Helle Blätter, dunkle Blätter. Erinnerungen eines Chirurgen". (ISBN 978-3421014993) which was reviewed in the Journal of the American College of Surgeons. A selection of his writings and lectures was published at Schattauer in 1997 under the title of "Fünfzig Jahre erlebter Chirurgie: Ausgewählte Vorträge und Schriften."(ISBN 978-3794506156).

== Biography ==
Nissen was born in a Jewish-German family in Neisse, Silesia, German Empire, in 1896. He was the son of Franz Nissen, a well-known surgeon. Rudolph Nissen pursued medical studies at the Ludwig-Maximilians-Universität München, Marburg University and the University of Breslau. He then trained in pathology under influential physician Ludwig Aschoff at the University of Freiburg. During the First World War he served in a medical corps unit and was severely injured by a gunshot in his lung which led to lifelong problems. He finished his medical studies after the war. In 1921, he came to the Ludwig-Maximilians-Universität München as an assistant to German surgeon Ferdinand Sauerbruch. Six years later, Sauerbruch and Nissen moved to the Charité at the Friedrich Wilhelm University of Berlin. In 1933, Nissen became the surgery department head at Istanbul University. The move was prompted by Hitler's Jewish boycott, although Nissen was at first not directly affected by anti-Jewish legislation because he had been an active World War I front soldier.

Nissen left Turkey for the United States in 1939, and later moved to the United States. He was a surgery research fellow at Massachusetts General Hospital for two years, and spent several years in New York as chair of the surgery programs at Jewish Hospital and Maimonides Medical Center. He was a department head at the University of Basel from 1952 to his retirement in 1967. He died in 1981 in Riehen.

== Surgical contributions ==
=== Nissen fundoplication ===
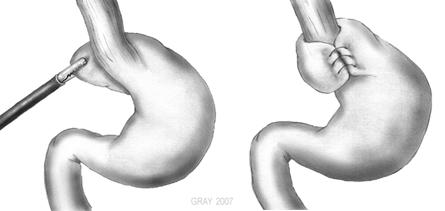
Nissen fundoplication

While in Istanbul in 1936, Nissen excised an esophageal ulcer from a 28-year-old patient. The operation required Nissen to remove a portion of the lower esophagus and join the remaining esophagus to the stomach. In an effort to avoid the backflow of stomach contents into the patient's esophagus, Nissen wrapped (plicated) folds of the patient's upper stomach around the lower esophagus. Following the patient subsequently, Nissen noted that the patient's problems with heartburn improved after surgery.

Through the 1940s and 1950s, Nissen treated many patients with hiatal hernias using conventional methods developed by other surgeons. He even performed one of these procedures, an anterior gastropexy, on eminent radiologist Gustav Bucky. Bucky was very ill when he presented to Nissen, but he completely recovered. Though Bucky remained asymptomatic for at least 15 years, many patients experienced relapses. By 1955, Nissen began to think back on the successful procedure in Istanbul. Now based in Basel, he operated on two patients with reflux esophagitis, wrapping a portion of the stomach around the lower esophagus. He published the results of the two cases in 1956.

=== Pneumonectomy ===
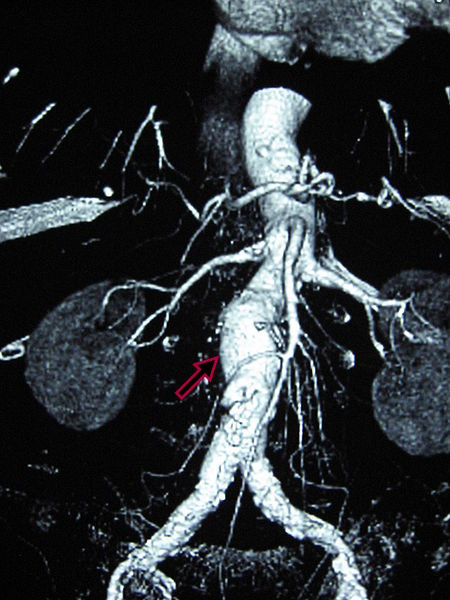
Abdominal aortic aneurysm

By training under Sauerbruch, Nissen developed unique skill in surgery of the chest. Through his own mentoring by Polish-Austrian surgeon Jan Mikulicz-Radecki, Sauerbruch had learned to perform thoracic surgery by use of a pressure chamber before it was possible to give anesthesia to patients through breathing tubes.

In 1931, Nissen treated a 12-year-old girl who had sustained a crush injury to the chest with chronic pus production from the left lung. Nissen elected to perform left pneumonectomy, or removal of the lung. The first surgery was halted when the patient experienced asystole ("flatline"). The patient was stabilized and the second phase of the pneumonectomy was completed two weeks later. The patient survived for several years. Nissen was the first Western physician to complete the procedure; successful pneumonectomy was reported in the United States in 1933.

=== Einstein's aneurysm repair ===
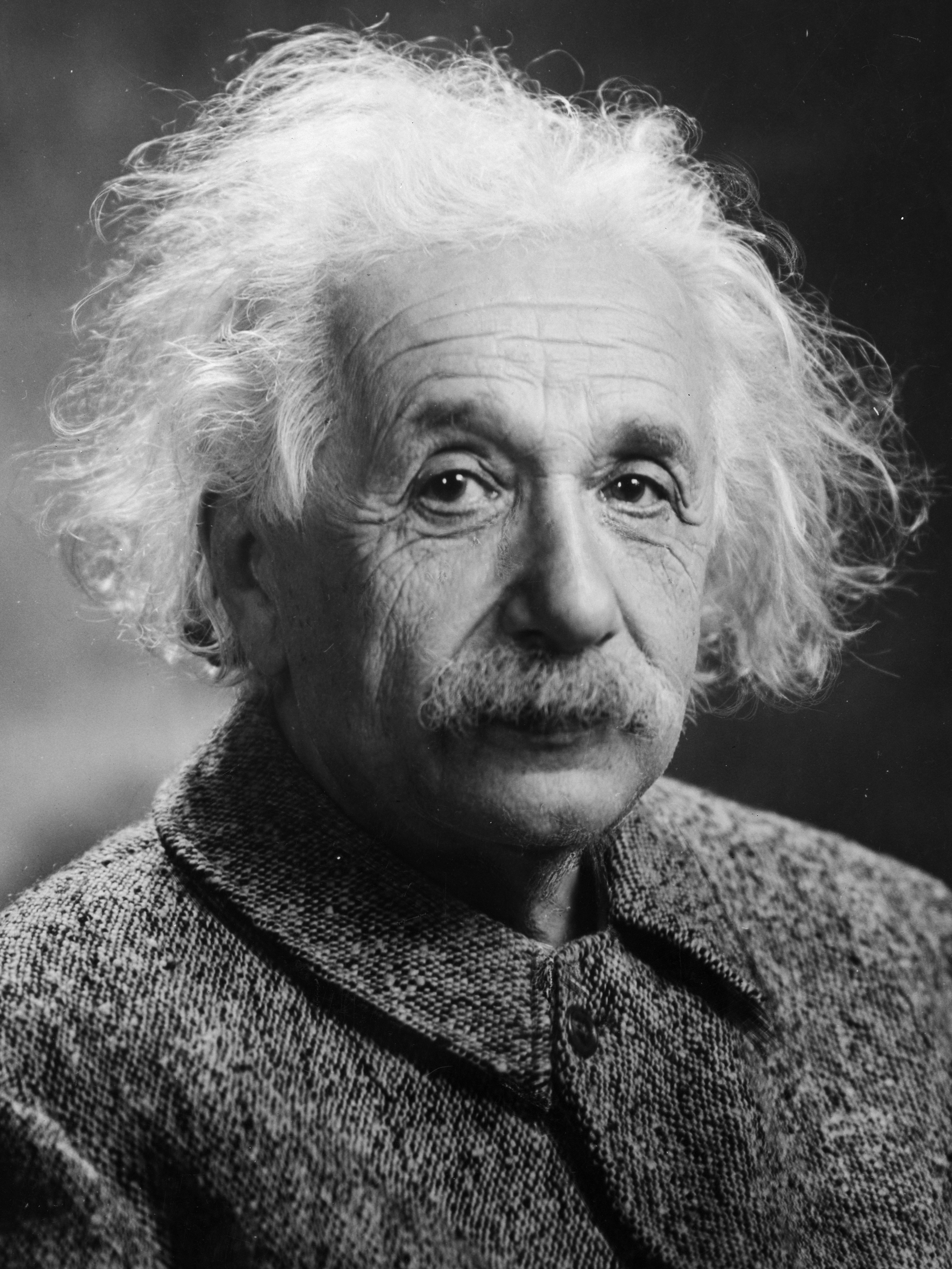
Albert Einstein in 1947

In December 1948, Nissen admitted Albert Einstein to Jewish Hospital for removal of intestinal cysts. However, the scientist was also suffering from an abdominal aortic aneurysm (AAA). An aneurysm is a dilatation that occurs in a blood vessel. In the portion of the aorta that runs through the abdomen, aneurysms are typically asymptomatic until rupture is imminent. AAA rupture can cause immediate death from exsanguination. Definitive surgical treatment for AAA had not been devised in the 1940s. Beginning in 1943, reinforcement with cellophane had been used to induce fibrosis in the vessel, decreasing the risk of rupture. Nissen wrapped the aneurysm with cellophane and Einstein recovered from the surgery.

Upon his hospital discharge, Einstein was surrounded by photographers, and he was photographed with his tongue sticking out at them. He sent an autographed newspaper clipping of the photo to Nissen with the inscription "To Nissen my tummy / The world my tongue." Einstein lived for several years after Nissen wrapped his AAA in cellophane. Einstein died in a Princeton, New Jersey hospital in 1955. Initial news reports listed gallbladder inflammation as the cause of death. However, his medical team had suspected gallbladder irritation resulting from a leaking AAA. An autopsy conducted by pathologist Thomas Harvey showed that he died of a leaking AAA.

By the time of Einstein's death, surgical AAA repair was technically possible but still very uncertain. The surgeon who saw Einstein in Princeton, Frank Glenn of New York Hospital, proposed surgery. Einstein was in his seventies and he elected to die peacefully rather than undergo surgery. "I want to go when I want," Einstein told his physicians. He told his secretary Helen Dukas, "I can die without the help of the doctors." He also told her that it was "tasteless to prolong life artificially. I have done my share. It is time to go. I will do it elegantly."

== Legacy ==
The Rudolf Nissen Prize is awarded by the Deutsche Gesellschaft für Allgemein- und Viszeralchirurgie (German Society of General and Visceral Surgery) to recognize surgeons who have advanced the field of gastroenterological surgery. In commemoration of his 100th birthday, a scientific publication of The International Society for Diseases of the Esophagus was dedicated to Nissen in 1996. In 2016, the Charité opened a new building for emergency admissions named after Nissen, the Rudolf-Nissen-Haus.
