= Stretta procedure =

- Specialty: Gastroenterology

Stretta is a minimally invasive endoscopic procedure for the treatment of gastroesophageal reflux disease (GERD) that delivers radiofrequency energy in the form of electromagnetic waves through electrodes at the end of a catheter to the lower esophageal sphincter (LES) and the gastric cardia – the region of the stomach just below the LES. The energy heats the tissue, ultimately causing it to swell and stiffen; the way this works was not understood as of 2015, but it was thought that perhaps the heat causes local inflammation, collagen deposition and muscular thickening of the LES and that it may disrupt the nerves there.

== History ==
Its relative efficacy is controversial, with the American College of Gastroenterology recommending against its use in 2013, and in the same year the Society of American Gastrointestinal and Endoscopic Surgeons (SAGES) giving it a strong recommendation for people who refuse laparoscopic Nissen fundoplication, which involves making incisions in the torso and wrapping part of the stomach around the base of the esophagus, and which is considered the gold standard for efficacy. In 2015 an American Society for Gastrointestinal Endoscopy guideline noted that the quality of evidence was low for Stretta and the other available endoscopic treatment for GERD (transoral incisionless fundoplication) and called for better research to be conducted; it suggested that endoscopic treatments for GERD be considered.

The device for carrying out the procedure was originally developed by a company called Curon which obtained FDA approval for the device in 2000 but then went bankrupt in 2006; the device was brought back to market by Mederi Therapeutics in 2010. The procedure costs between $3,000 and $4,000 as of 2004.

== Evidence ==
An American Society of Gastrointestinal Endoscopy (ASGE) statement in June 2015 state that endoscopic antireflux therapy is a potential treatment based on the 2012 review.

In 2015 three reviews were published discussing the relative safety and effectiveness of the procedure compared with other endoscopic procedures delivered through the mouth, drug treatment (generally proton-pump inhibitors), and fundoplication.

One was a systematic review and meta-analysis of clinical trials conducted with Stretta, done in response to the 2013 SAGES review (which did not include meta-analysis). This review found that quality of studies that had been conducted was generally poor, and that compared with sham therapy (used a placebo for medical device clinical trials), the procedure did not change time spent at a pH less than 4, did not increase lower esophageal sphincter pressure (LESP), did not allow people to stop treatment with proton-pump inhibitors, and did not improve health-related quality of life.

Another of the 2015 reviews was a narrative literature review, noted its long history of use, and found the procedure safe and effective, and noted that the procedure complemented drug treatment and fundoplication, providing a useful option.

The other 2015 review was a narrative literature review was more tentative, noting the long safety record but only willing to state that the procedure "may be effective in reducing symptom burden and quality of life scores up to 8 years post-intervention. However, there does not appear to be any sustained improvement in objective outcomes and there is no evidence that Stretta results in improved outcomes as compared to surgical intervention.

A more recent study published in 2020 evaluated 25 patients post Stretta Procedure and the results concluded significant improvement in reflux symptoms and quality of life, lowering Heartburn Score (DeMeester score) from 3.7 in women and 4.0 in men to 1.6±1 (p = 0.05) in women and 1.68±1.19 (p = 0.05) in men.

A 2012 systematic review and meta-analysis upon which the 2013 SAGES review had relied, had found that it improves GERD symptoms.
