= Winkelstein =

Winkelstein is a surname. Notable people with the surname include:

- Asher Winkelstein (1893–1972), American gastroenterologist
- Beth Winkelstein, American bioengineer and scholar
- Warren Winkelstein (1922–2012), American epidemiologist
