= Belching =

Release of gas from the upper digestive tract through the mouth

Belch
- Other names: Belching, burping, ructus, eruptus, eructation
- Specialty: Gastroenterology

Belching (also called burping and eructation) is the audible release of gas from the upper gastrointestinal tract (esophagus and stomach) of humans, and other animals into the pharynx, and usually out through the mouth.

In humans, belching can be caused by normal eating processes, or as a side effect of other medical conditions. When belching is excessive, it may be classed as a belching disorder, one of the gastroduodenal disorders. Belching is a frequent symptom of gastroesophageal reflux disease (GERD) but this is distinct from a belching disorder.

There is a range of levels of social acceptance for burping: within certain contexts and cultures, burping is acceptable. In some cultures and situations it may even be perceived as humorous, while in others it is seen as impolite or even offensive and therefore unacceptable. An infant often accumulates gas when feeding, and this needs to be vented by way of burping. To burp the baby is the common expression.

Belching is also very common among other mammals. In particular, burping by domesticated ruminants, such as cows or sheep, is a major contributor of methane emissions and may have a negative effect on the environment. Significant research is being done to find mitigation strategies for ruminant burping, such as by modifying the animals' diets with Asparagopsis taxiformis, a type of red algae.

== Causes ==
The belch reflex is responsible for the ability to belch. Most of the air that is swallowed during eating and drinking cannot be absorbed in the gastrointestinal tract and is vented by way of belching. Swallowed air is allowed to rise from the stomach into the esophagus, through a relaxed lower esophageal sphincter. The gaseous distention of the esophagus triggers the belch reflex in the relaxation and opening of the upper esophageal sphincter to release the air into the pharynx.

The expelled gas is mainly a mixture of the main components of atmospheric air - oxygen and nitrogen. Burps can be caused by drinking beverages such as beer and carbonated drinks, and in these cases, the expelled gas is mainly carbon dioxide.

Chewing gum, sucking on hard candy, talking while eating or drinking, or while smoking, can also cause more air to be swallowed and therefore increased belching. Also swallowing air may in some people be a nervous habit.

Belching can also be a symptom of disorders that cause indigestion such as a hiatal hernia, gastritis, gastroesophageal reflux disease (GERD), an ulcer, infection with H. pylori, gallbladder disease, and food allergies.

== Complications ==
In microgravity environments, burping is frequently associated with regurgitation, known as wet burping. With reduced gravity, the stomach contents are more likely to rise up into the esophagus when the gastroesophageal sphincter is relaxed, along with the expelled air.

== Clinical significance ==
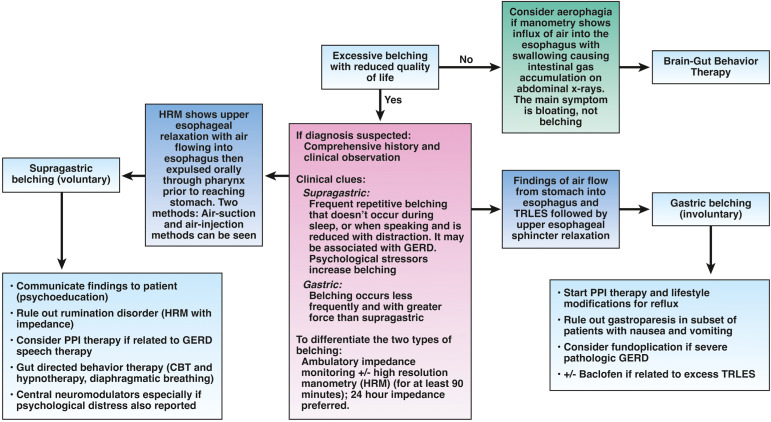
Diagrammatic flow chart for management of belching disorders

=== Belching disorders ===
Belching, when excessive, can be due to either of two belching disorders, excessive supragastric belching or excessive gastric belching, two types of gastroduodenal disorders. A belching disorder is also termed as a disorder of gut–brain interaction (DGBI).

Supragastric occurs above the stomach in the esophagus, and is classed as voluntary. In supragastric belching the reflux episodes are mainly non-acidic making the use of proton pump inhibitors that reduce stomach acidity, non-effective. This type of belching disorder is often linked to anxiety, and is classed as a behavioral disorder as is rumination syndrome, another gastroduodenal disorder.

Gastric belching arises from the stomach itself, and is classed as involuntary. When gas is accumulated in the stomach it collects in the cardia the part nearest to the lower esophageal sphincter (LES). The increased volume stimulates stretch receptors in the wall of the stomach that initiates a vagovagal reflex that temporarily relaxes the LES, known as a transient LES relaxation/TLESR, to allow air to move into the esophagus.

Both types of belching disorder may trigger reflux.

=== Inability to belch syndrome ===
A disorder that causes an inability to belch (abelchia) is known as retrograde cricopharyngeus dysfunction (R-CPD) or retrograde upper esophageal sphincter dysfunction (R-UESD), involves the cricopharyngeus muscle not being able to relax, leading to an inability to belch. R-CPD was first discovered in 1987, and further research gained attention in the mid to late 2010s. Common symptoms include stomach rumbling, bloating, and flatulence; lesser but common symptoms can be potentially painful hiccups, nausea, constipation, hypersalivation, or shortness of breath. A high-resolution manometry, esophageal manometry or fluoroscopy by an ENT doctor is able to assess the issue. 80% of patients were successfully treated with botox after a single injection. If the injection is unsuccessful, an alternative is partial cricopharyngeal myotomy. Chest pain associated with burping can rarely occur.

== Society and culture ==
=== Acceptance ===
Some South Asian cultures view burping as acceptable in particular situations. For example, a burping guest can be a sign to the host that the meal satisfied them and they are full.

In Japan, burping during a meal is considered bad manners. Burping during a meal is also considered unacceptable in Western cultures, such as North America and Europe.

=== Infants ===
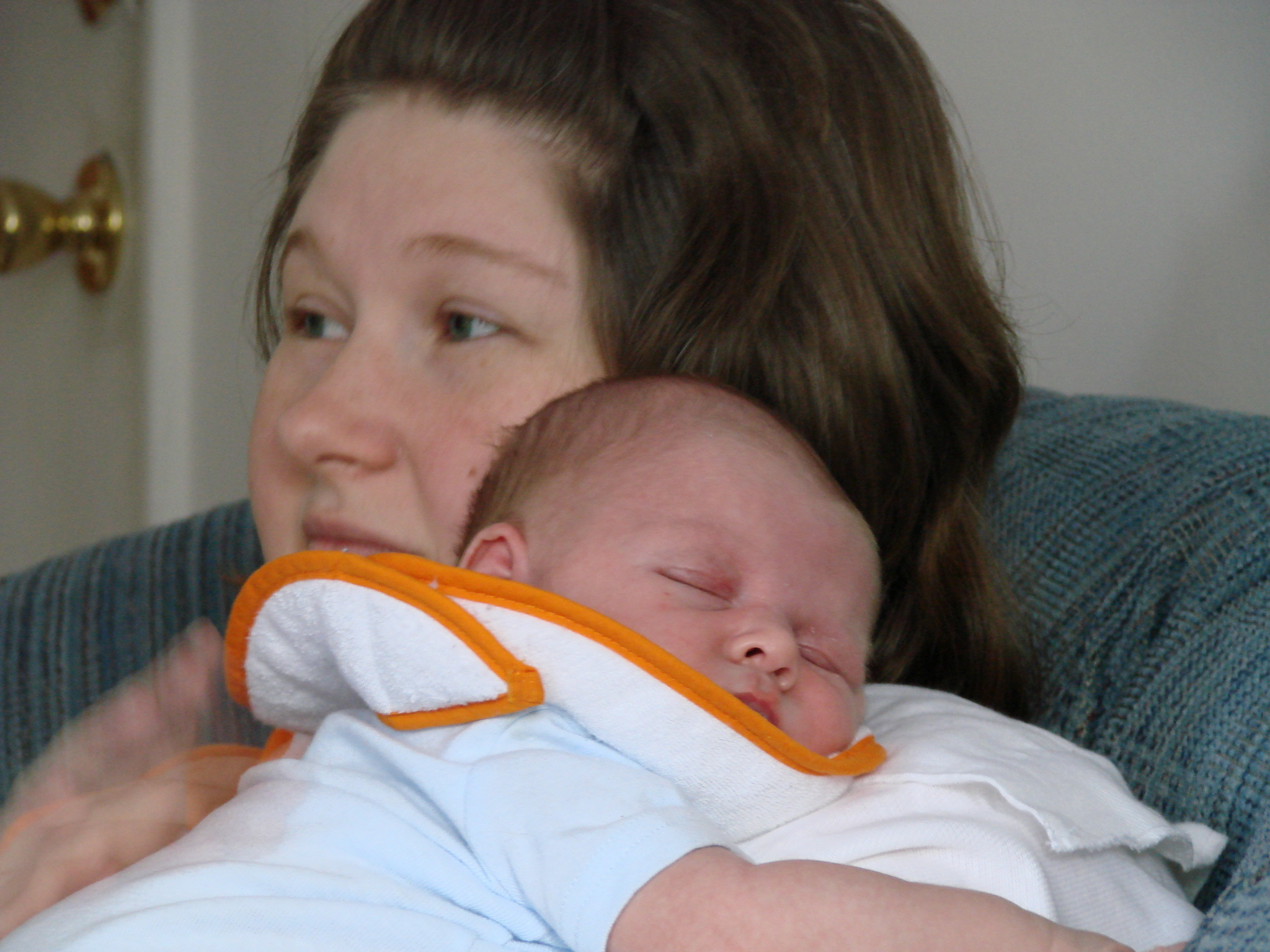
An infant being burped against an adult's shoulder

Babies are likely to accumulate gas in the stomach while feeding and experience considerable discomfort (and agitation) until assisted. Burping an infant involves placing the child in a position conducive to gas expulsion (for example against the adult's shoulder, with the infant's stomach resting on the adult's chest) and then lightly patting the lower back. Because burping can cause vomiting, a "burp cloth" or "burp pad" is sometimes employed on the shoulder to protect clothing.

=== World record ===
The Guinness World Record for the loudest burp was 112.4 dB, set by Neville Sharp from Darwin, Australia in 2021. This is approximately as loud as a jet engine at 100 m (330 ft). The record was previously held by Paul Hunn, who held the record for 12 years.

=== Burped speech ===
It is possible to voluntarily induce burping through swallowing air and then expelling it, and by manipulation of the vocal tract produce burped speech. While this is often employed as a means of entertainment or competition, it can also act as an alternative means of vocalisation for people who have undergone a laryngectomy, with the burp replacing laryngeal phonation. This is known as esophageal speech.

== Other animals ==
Many other mammals, such as cows, dogs and sheep, also burp.

=== Ruminants ===
Much of the gas expelled is produced as a byproduct of the ruminant's digestive process. These gases notably include a large volume of methane, produced exclusively by a narrow cohort of methanogenic archaea in the animal's gut; Escherichia coli (E. coli) and other bacteria lack the enzymes and cofactors required for methane production. A lactating cow produces about 322g of methane per day, i.e. more than 117 kg per year through burping and exhalation, making commercially farmed cows a major (37%) contributor to anthropogenic methane emissions, and hence to the greenhouse effect. 95% of this gas (wind) is emitted through burping. This has led scientists at the Commonwealth Scientific and Industrial Research Organisation of Perth, Australia, to develop an anti-methanogen vaccine to minimize methane in cow burps.

One reason why cows burp so much is that they are often fed foods that their digestive systems cannot fully process, such as corn and soy. Some farmers have reduced burping in their cows by feeding them alfalfa and flaxseed, which are closer to the grasses that they had eaten in the wild before they were domesticated.

=== Birds ===
There is no documented evidence that birds burp, though ornithologists believe that there is nothing which physiologically prevents them from doing so. However, since the microbiota of birds do not include the same set of gas-producing bacteria that mammals have to aid in digestion, gas hardly builds up in the gastrointestinal tracts of birds.

== See also ==
- Aerophagia
- Penelope and the Humongous Burp
