= Roemheld =

Roemheld or Römheld is a German surname. Notable people with the surname include:

- Heinz Eric Roemheld (1901–1985), American composer
- Volker Roemheld (1941–2013), German agricultural scientist, plant physiologist and soil biologist

== See also ==
- Roemheld syndrome, a complex of gastrocardiac symptoms
