= RCPD =

RCPD may refer to:

- Redwood City Police Department, Redwood City, California
- Rockville City Police Department, Rockville, Maryland
- Retrograde cricopharyngeal dysfunction, a condition in which people are unable to burp.
