= Hill repair =

- Specialty: Gastroenterology

A Hill repair is an anti-acid reflux procedure. It is similar to the Nissen fundoplication. Though far less common owing to a greater degree of difficulty, studies indicate a similar rate of efficacy. It is performed almost exclusively in the Pacific Northwest.
