= EndoStim Electrical Stimulation Therapy =

Form of anti-reflux surgery

- Specialty: Gastroenterology

EndoStim Electrical Stimulation Therapy is a form of anti-reflux surgery, intended to assist in correcting a problem with the muscles at the bottom of the esophagus (the tube from the mouth to the stomach). Problems with these muscles allow gastroesophageal reflux disease (GERD) to happen. The procedure was developed by Endostim, based in St. Louis, Missouri, and Amsterdam, Netherlands.

== Technique ==
EndoStim therapy directly targets the weak lower esophageal sphincter (LES) muscle, without altering anatomy or using mechanical constraints. EndoStim's proprietary technology uses functional electrical stimulation (a type of neuromodulation) to restore esophageal function, thereby reducing GERD symptoms. Tiny pulses of electric current are delivered to the LES without causing any sensation.

The implantable pulse generator (IPG) and bipolar lead deliver therapy to the lower esophageal sphincter. The IPG is a small device similar to a pacemaker and is implanted under the skin of the abdomen. The lead connects two electrodes from the IPG to the esophagus. Both the IPG and lead are placed laparoscopically through a short, minimally-invasive procedure under general anesthesia.

The implantation procedure lasts approximately 40 minutes, and involves attaching two small electrodes from the lead to the lower esophagus. The lead is brought out into a small pocket located under the abdominal skin and connected to the stimulation device (IPG). Minimally-invasive procedures have been shown to dramatically reduce healing time as well as reduce procedure risk.

The first clinical study using EndoStim technology was published in 2010, showing that in patients with GERD, electrical stimulation therapy significantly and consistently increased LES pressure.

An open-label trial conducted in Chile showed the procedure showed “significant and sustained improvement in GERD symptoms, esophageal pH, and reduction in proton-pump inhibitor (PPI) usage without any side effects” in patients.

== Usage ==
Endostim therapy is currently not approved by the U.S. Food and Drug Administration (FDA).

The procedure, however, received the CE mark allowing implants in Europe. Endostim is carried out in Argentina, Chile, Colombia, Brazil, Hong Kong, India, Denmark, Germany, the Netherlands, and Switzerland.
