= Acid perfusion test =

- Synonyms: Bernstein test

Acid perfusion test, also called the Bernstein test, is a mostly obsolete test done to reproduce the pain when the lower esophagus is irrigated with an acid solution in people with GERD (gastroesophageal reflux disease).

There will be a negative result in normal people, but a false positive reading may be seen in up to 15% of people.

The Bernstein test is simple and cheap but mostly obsolete nowadays. Esophageal pH monitoring is the gold standard for GERD. However, the initial management is with proton-pump inhibitors. If the symptoms of GERD (such as heartburn, hoarseness, or chronic cough) persist, then 24-hr pH monitoring should be considered.
