= Retrograde cricopharyngeus dysfunction =

Medical condition

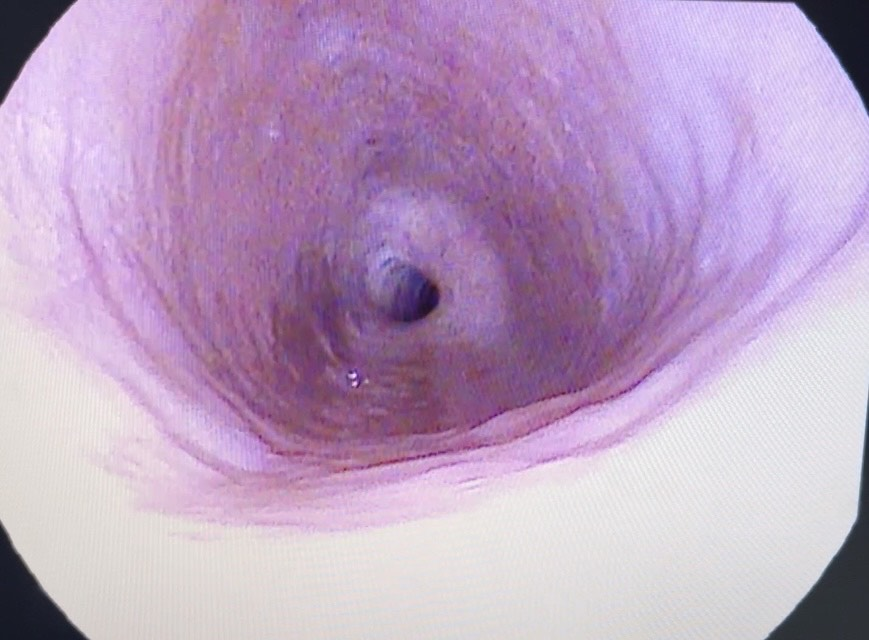
An esophagus distended with trapped air in a subject with R-CPD. In normal persons, normal swallowed air travels back up to the esophagus. The neural pathway mediating belching directs opening of the upper esophageal sphincter in response to esophageal air filling; in R-CPD this mechanism fails and there is no upper esophageal sphincter opening. NB: This image was taken using a rigid scope without insufflated air.

Retrograde cricopharyngeus dysfunction (R-CPD; also known as the inability to belch syndrome or abelchia) is a medical condition first identified by gastroenterologist Dr. Peter Kahrilas in 1987. However, the condition began to receive significant attention only following a 2019 report by ENT surgeon Dr. Robert Bastian that described a very high rate of symptomatic relief from injection of botulinum toxin into the cricopharyngeus muscle. Awareness of the condition has spread predominantly among patients themselves, rather than the medical community, via forums and social media. Awareness of the condition amongst primary care physicians and specialists remains low and patients report needing to employ online research to find specialists who are familiar with and can treat the condition.

== Symptoms ==
The condition is characterised by chronic gastrointestinal symptoms relating to excessive gas retention, including abdominal bloating with distension, flatulence, audible gurgling sounds, and chest and abdominal discomfort. Some people with the condition are also unable to vomit, or can do so only with great difficulty. In most cases, inability to belch is a lifelong problem. R-CPD has a significant detrimental impact on patients' quality of life.

== Anatomy and Pathophysiology ==
The cricopharyngeus muscle is the major muscle comprising the upper esophageal sphincter (UES). It is a strap-like, C-shaped muscle at the base of the throat behind the larynx. The UES encircles the proximal (upper) opening of the esophagus. The upper esophageal sphincter has a residual tone that is in fact augmented as it is stretched open.

Swallowing of air during eating and drinking is normal. However, as air cannot be absorbed by the gastrointestinal tract it is mostly vented via burping. A transient relaxation of the lower esophageal sphincter allows swallowed air in the stomach to rise into the esophagus, where it triggers a reflex relaxation and opening of the UES. In R-CPD, all steps of this belch reflex occur normally up until the last one; despite gaseous distension of the esophagus, the UES fails to open. It is believed that all the symptoms of R-CPD result from failed expulsion of swallowed air and consequent buildup of gas throughout the entire gastrointestinal tract.

== Diagnosis ==
Many patients with R-CPD have suffered from years of delayed diagnosis and misdiagnosis and unsuccessful empiric treatment of gastrointestinal disorders including GERD, aerophagia, gallbladder dysfunction, and IBS. Patients with R-CPD often undergo a variety of diagnostic tests including nasendoscopy, gastrointestinal endoscopy, and barium swallowing, which are typically uninformative.

In cases in which symptoms are typical of R-CPD, many experienced specialists have treated the condition without formal diagnostic testing. However, physicians from the Netherlands and Australia have validated a specific diagnostic protocol using esophageal high-resolution manometry that is highly accurate in obtaining a conclusive diagnosis of R-CPD.

== Treatments ==
The treatment of choice is injection of Botulinum toxin into the cricopharyngeus muscle. The effect of Botulinum toxin is to temporarily weaken or paralyze the muscle. Reported success rates for inducing the ability to belch are extremely high, ranging from 88 to 92 percent. The effect of botox is delayed for three days on average and most patients with successful results report the ability to belch by the fifth day after the procedure. For most, the effect lasts beyond the first three to six months of direct Botox effect and is usually a lifelong cure. A small percentage of patients require a subsequent injection of Botox for lasting results. An alternative, if the botox injection is unsuccessful, is to undergo partial cricopharyngeal myotomy.

=== Method of Injection ===
Presently, there are three described methods by which cricopharyngeal Botox injection can be performed:

1. The most commonly performed approach is injection via direct (rigid) laryngoscope, under general anesthesia. This is the technique favored by most ENT surgeons.
2. An injection technique via flexible gastrointestinal endoscopy was pioneered by Australian gastroenterologist Dr. Santosh Sanagapalli. This technique appears to have equivalent high success rates, while having potential advantages given it avoids the risks associated with rigid scopes and general anesthesia.
3. Injection can also be performed by a percutaneous (directly through the skin) approach. While success rates are markedly lower, percutaneous injection has the advantage of being able to be performed as an in-office procedure under local anaesthetic.

=== Side effects of treatment ===
Being related to the temporary effect of the Botulinum toxin, side effects are also temporary and typically resolve without treatment. The most common side effect is difficulty swallowing, which often requires temporary diet modification and altered eating style. Less common side effects include sore throat, difficulty breathing on exertion, voice change, and reflux/regurgitation. Side effects appear to be similar no matter which injection technique is used.
