= Esophagogastric dissociation =

Surgical procedure used to treat gastroesophageal reflux

- Specialty: Gastroenterology

Esophagogastric dissociation is a surgical procedure that is sometimes used to treat gastroesophageal reflux, mainly in neurologically impaired children. It has been suggested as an alternative to Nissen fundoplication for these cases. Preliminary studies have shown it may have a lower failure rate and a lower incidence of recurrent reflux.
