= Phrenoesophageal ligament =

Ligament of the esophagus and diaphragm

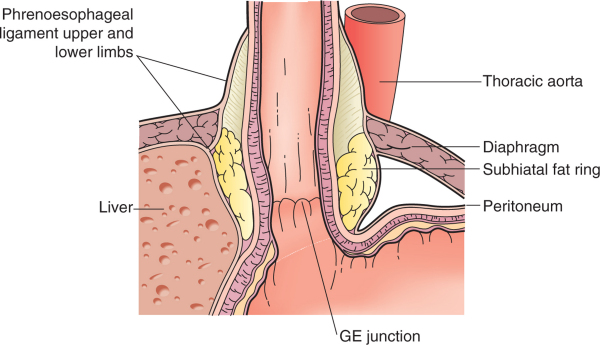
The phrenoesophageal ligament in relationship to the cardia and fundus of the stomach

The phrenoesophageal ligament (phrenicoesophageal ligament, or phrenoesophageal membrane) is the ligament by which the esophagus is attached to the diaphragm. It is an extension of the inferior diaphragmatic fascia and is divided into an upper and lower limb which attach to the superior and inferior surfaces of the diaphragm respectively at the esophageal hiatus. The upper limb attaches the esophagus to the superior surface of the diaphragm and the lower limb attaches the cardia region of the stomach to the inferior surface of the diaphragm at the cardiac notch of stomach. The ligament allows independent movement of the diaphragm and esophagus during respiration and swallowing.
