= Cricopharyngeal myotomy =

Surgery procedure

Cricopharyngeal myotomy is a surgical sectioning of the cricopharyngeus muscle, also known as the upper esophageal sphincter, that has been advocated for the treatment of cricopharyngeal spasm, or cricopharyngeal achalasia, that leads to cervical dysphagia in the clinical setting.

This surgery can be used for retrograde cricopharyngeal dysfunction (R-CPD), a complication causing the inability to burp.
