= Nissen fundoplication =

Surgical procedure to treat gastric reflux and hiatal hernia

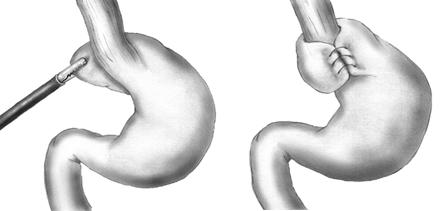
- Diagram of a Nissen fundoplication.
- Other names: Laparoscopic Nissen fundoplication
- ICD-9-CM: 44.66, 44.67

A Nissen fundoplication, or laparoscopic Nissen fundoplication when performed via laparoscopic surgery, is a surgical procedure to treat gastroesophageal reflux disease (GERD) and hiatal hernia. In GERD, it is usually performed when medical therapy has failed; but, with a Type II (paraesophageal) hiatus hernia, it is the first-line procedure. The Nissen fundoplication is total (360°), but partial fundoplications known as Thal (270° anterior), Belsey (270° anterior transthoracic), Dor (anterior 180–200°), Lind (300° posterior), and Toupet fundoplications (posterior 270°) are alternative procedures with somewhat different indications and outcomes.

== History ==
Dr. Rudolph Nissen (1896–1981) first performed the procedure in 1955 and published the results of two cases in a 1956 Swiss Medical Weekly. In 1961 he published a more detailed overview of the procedure. Nissen originally called the surgery "gastroplication". The procedure has borne his name since it gained popularity in the 1970s.

== Indications ==
The most common indication for a fundoplication is GERD that has failed lifestyle modification and medical management. Patients that continue to have reflux symptoms or that have had uncontrolled reflux symptoms for more than five years are also candidates for surgical management. Complications that arise from long term GERD such as severe esophagitis, stricture formation, and ulcer development, all of which can be seen on endoscopy, warrant surgical intervention. Presence of Barrett's esophagus is not an indication, as the benefit of a fundoplication in preventing progression into adenocarcinoma is controversial. Respiratory symptoms and upper airway symptoms such as cough, asthma, hoarseness are also indications for surgical intervention. In the pediatric population, infants who fail to thrive or have inadequate weight gain despite proton-pump inhibitor (PPI) therapy may also benefit from fundoplication.

== Technique ==
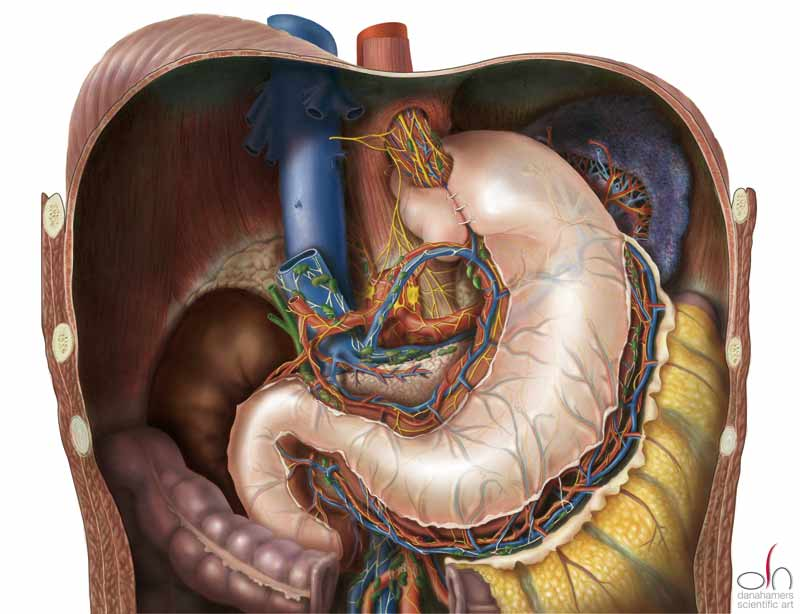
A completed Nissen fundoplication

In a fundoplication, the gastric fundus (upper part) of the stomach is wrapped, or plicated, around the lower end of the esophagus and stitched in place, reinforcing the closing function of the lower esophageal sphincter (LES). The esophageal hiatus is also narrowed down by sutures to prevent or treat concurrent hiatal hernia, in which the fundus slides up through the enlarged esophageal hiatus of the diaphragm. The surgeon should begin with ligating and dividing the short gastric arteries.

In a Nissen fundoplication, also called a complete fundoplication, the fundus is wrapped the entire 360 degrees around the esophagus. In contrast, surgery for achalasia is generally accompanied by either a Dor or Toupet partial fundoplication, which is less likely than a Nissen wrap to aggravate the dysphagia that characterizes achalasia. In a Dor (anterior) fundoplication, the fundus is laid over the top of the esophagus; while in a Toupet (posterior) fundoplication, the fundus is wrapped around the back of the esophagus.

The procedure can be performed with open surgery but is now routinely performed laparoscopically, as laparoscopic surgery has decreased post-operative complications and decreased hospital stay. When used to alleviate gastroesophageal reflux symptoms in patients with delayed gastric emptying, it is frequently combined with modification of the pylorus via pyloromyotomy or pyloroplasty.

This procedure can also be completed robotically. Outcomes comparing laparoscopic fundoplication to robotic fundoplication show similar clinical outcomes, but robotic fundoplication is more likely to have an increased length of operative time and financial cost.

== Mechanism of relief ==
Whenever the stomach contracts, it also closes off the esophagus instead of squeezing stomach acids into it. This prevents the reflux of gastric acid (in GERD). Although antacids and PPI drug therapy can reduce the effects of reflux acid, successful surgical treatment has the advantage of eliminating drug side-effects and damaging effects from other components of reflux such as bile or gastric contents. The Nissen fundoplication reduces reflux by reinforcing the LES by increasing LES pressure and increasing the LES length.

== Effectiveness ==
Nissen (complete) fundoplication is generally considered to be safe and effective, with a mortality rate of less than 1% and many of the most common post-operative complications minimized or eliminated by the partial fundoplication procedures now more commonly used. Studies have shown that after 10 years, 89.5% of patients are still symptom-free. However, more recent systematic reviews suggest that while initial outcomes are favorable, the long-term efficacy of laparoscopic Nissen fundoplication may decline over time, with reoperation rates exceeding 16% and an increased need for proton pump inhibitors at 10 years post-surgery. When compared to stand alone medical therapy with PPIs, Nissen fundoplication has been found to be superior in reducing acid reflux as well as the symptoms associated with reflux. Fundoplication was found to be better at increasing LES pressure than PPI therapy, whilst having similar risk for adverse events. In patients with non-acid reflux, a hiatal hernia, or respiratory symptoms, surgical intervention was found to be more effective at controlling symptoms than PPIs alone.

== Complications ==
Complications include "gas bloat syndrome", dysphagia (trouble swallowing), dumping syndrome, excessive scarring, vagus nerve injury and, rarely, achalasia. The fundoplication can also come undone over time in about 5–10% of cases, leading to recurrence of symptoms. If the symptoms warrant a repeat surgery, the surgeon may use Marlex or another form of artificial mesh to strengthen the connection. Postoperative ileus, which is common after abdominal surgery, is possible.

In "gas bloat syndrome", fundoplication can alter the mechanical ability of the stomach to eliminate swallowed air by belching, leading to an accumulation of gas in the stomach or small intestine. Data varies, but some degree of gas-bloat may occur in as many as 41% of Nissen patients, whereas the occurrence is less with patients undergoing partial anterior fundoplication. Gas bloat syndrome is usually self-limiting within 2 to 4 weeks, but in some it may persist. The offending gas may also come from dietary sources (especially carbonated beverages), or involuntary swallowing of air (aerophagia). If postoperative gas-bloat syndrome does not resolve with time, dietary restrictions, counseling regarding aerophagia, medications, and correction – either by endoscopic balloon dilatation or repeat surgery to revise the Nissen fundoplication to a partial fundoplication – may be necessary.

Acute dysphagia or short term trouble swallowing is a symptom that most patients will have after having a fundoplication. Patients who have dysphagia prior to surgery are more likely to have some dysphagia post-operatively. Symptoms of dysphagia will often resolve on their own within a few months. Short-term dysphagia is controlled by modifying diet to include more easily swallowed food such as liquids and soft foods. Dysphagia that persists longer than three months will need further evaluation, typically with a barium swallow study, esophageal manometry, or endoscopy. Structural changes such as movement of the wrap, herniation, development of stenosis or stricture may lead to persistent dysphagia. Previously undiagnosed achalasia or a wrap that is too tight may also lead to persistent dysphagia. Depending on the etiology of persistent dysphagia, a trial of PPI therapy, endoscopic dilation, or surgical revision may be necessary.

Vomiting is sometimes impossible or, if not, very painful after a fundoplication, with the likelihood of this complication typically decreasing in the months after surgery. In some cases, the purpose of this operation is to correct excessive vomiting. Initially, vomiting is impossible; however, small amounts of vomit may be produced after the wrap settles over time, and in extreme cases such as alcohol poisoning or food poisoning, the patient may be able to vomit freely with some amount of pain.

== See also ==
- Esophagogastric dissociation
