= Esophageal hiatus =

Anatomical hiatus

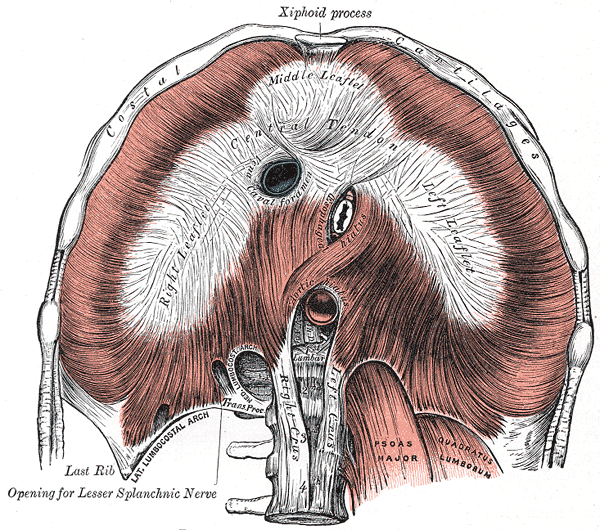
- The diaphragm. Under surface. (Esophageal hiatus labeled at center right.)

Details

Identifiers
- Latin: hiatus oesophageus
- TA98: A04.4.02.011
- TA2: 2344
- FMA: 58289

In human anatomy, the esophageal hiatus is an opening in the diaphragm through which the esophagus and the vagus nerve pass.

== Structure ==
The esophageal hiatus is an oval opening in (sources differ) the right crus of the diaphragm/left crus of the diaphragm, with fibres of the right crus looping around the hiatus to form a sling (upon inspiration, this sling would constrict the esophagus, forming a functional (not anatomical) sphincter that prevents gastric contents from refluxing up the esophagus when intra-abdominal pressure rises during inspiration). Fibers of the right crus decussate inferior to the hiatus.

=== Contents ===
The esophageal hiatus gives passage to the oesophagus as well as the anterior and the posterior vagal trunk, esophageal branches of the left gastric artery and vein, and some lymphatic vessels. The transversalis fascia lining the inferior surface of the diaphragm extends superiorly through the hiatus to blend with the endothoracic fascia and attach to the oesophagus 2–3 cm superior to the phrenoesophageal ligament.

=== Relations ===
The esophageal hiatus is located at level of the tenth thoracic vertebra (T10), 2.5 cm to the left of the midline, and (sources differ) posterior to the 7th left costal cartilage/at the level of the 8th or 9th intercostal spaces. It is placed superior, anterior, and slightly left of the aortic hiatus.

== Clinical significance ==
Hiatal hernia occurs when part of the stomach passes through the esophageal hiatus.

== See also ==
- Hiatus hernia
