= Esophageal pH monitoring =

Method of diagnosing and measuring gastric acid reflux

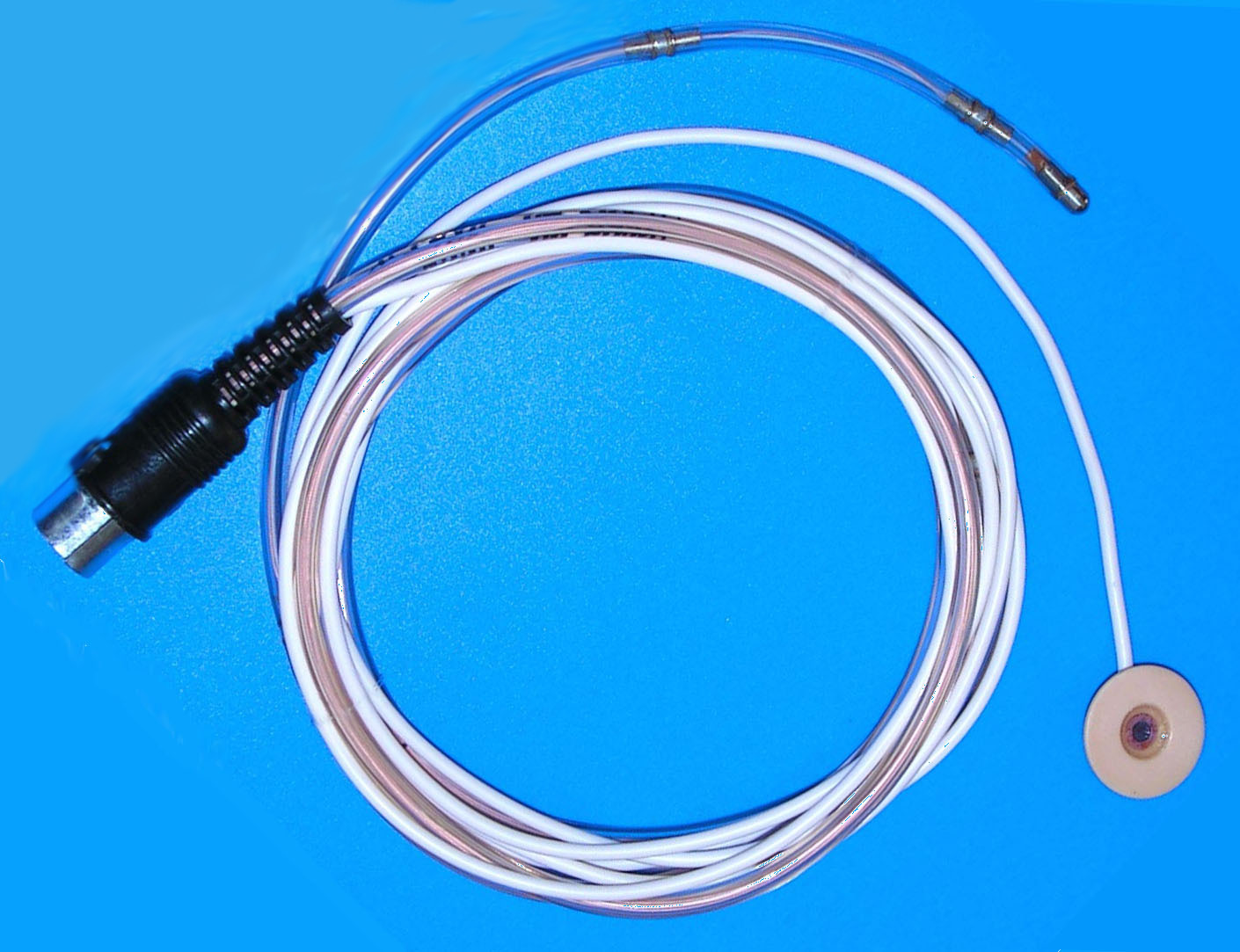
- pH-probe for measuring acidity in gastrointestinal tract
- MeSH: D050782
- OPS-301 code: 1-316
- MedlinePlus: 003401

In gastroenterology, esophageal pH monitoring is the current gold standard for diagnosis of gastroesophageal reflux disease (GERD). It provides direct physiologic measurement of acid in the esophagus and is the most objective method to document reflux disease, assess the severity of the disease and monitor the response of the disease to medical or surgical treatment. It can also be used in diagnosing laryngopharyngeal reflux.

== Background ==
The importance of refluxed gastric contents in the pathogenesis of GERD was emphasized by Winkelstein who introduced the term "peptic esophagitis" and by Bernstein and Baker who reported the symptom of heartburn following instillation of hydrochloric acid in the distal esophagus in what then became known as the acid perfusion test. Formal measurement of acid in the esophagus was first described in 1960 by Tuttle. He used a glass pH probe to map the gastroesophageal pH gradient, and demonstrated a sharp gradient in normal subjects and a gradual, sloping gradient in patients with esophagitis. Four years later, Miller used an indwelling esophageal pH electrode to continuously measure esophageal and gastric pH for a period up to 12 hours. This technique required that the patient keep their hands immersed in saline to serve as a reference. Prolonged monitoring became feasible in 1974 when Johnson and DeMeester developed a dependable external reference electrode. Using this technique to monitor esophageal acid exposure patients for periods up to 24 hours, DeMeester and Johnson were able to identify the most important parameters of esophageal acid exposure, and they developed a composite pH score to quantify gastroesophageal reflux. The initial 24-hour pH studies required hospitalization until the introduction of microcircuits in the 1980s that allowed portable esophageal pH monitoring in an outpatient setting.

== Clinical application ==
Gastroesophageal reflux disease (GERD) is a common disease in western countries. In the United States, 7% of the population experiences heartburn daily and 44% at least once a month. Heartburn occurs when esophageal mucosa is exposed to the acidic gastric content, but the complaint of heartburn is not always a reliable guide to the presence of acid reflux in the esophagus. Further, only half of the patients with increased esophageal acid exposure will have esophagitis. Therefore, the diagnosis of gastroesophageal reflux disease (GERD) on the basis of symptoms or endoscopic findings is problematic.

Although there remains no gold standard for the diagnosis of GERD, ambulatory esophageal pH monitoring can provide data to guide further evaluation and treatment of patients with GERD-associated symptoms. In the past, an indwelling nasoesophageal catheter was the only way to measure esophageal acid exposure. Because this method is associated with nasal and pharyngeal discomfort and rhinorrhea, patients may have limited their activity and become more sedentary during the monitored period. This may have resulted in less acid reflux and a false negative test. A catheter-free radio telemetric system allows a longer period of monitoring and may be better tolerated.

== Techniques ==
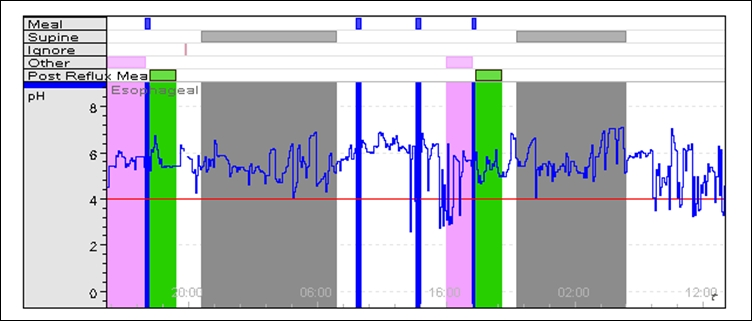
96 Hour Bravo pH monitoring A sample of Bravo pH tracing recorded over 48 hours

Esophageal pH monitoring is currently performed using one of the following three techniques:

1. Single sensor pH monitoring using a pH catheter
2. Dual sensor pH monitoring using a pH catheter
3. Wireless pH monitoring using Bravo pH capsule or OMOM pH monitoring capsule

The duration of the test is 24 hours in the first and second techniques and 48 hours for the Bravo capsule or more (96 hours) for OMOM capsule.

== pH sensor location and probe placement ==
In assessment of distal esophageal pH, the sensor is placed 5 cm above the upper border of the lower esophageal sphincter (LES) determined by esophageal manometry. To measure proximal esophageal acid exposure, the second sensor is placed 1-5 below the lower border of the upper esophageal sphincter (UES). The Bravo pH capsule is placed either transnasally based on manometric measurements, or following endoscopy. In transnasal placement, the capsule is placed 5 cm above the upper border of the LES, and in endoscopic placement 6 cm above the gastroesophageal junction. The same applies to OMOM pH monitoring capsule.

== Components of esophageal pH monitoring ==
A reflux episode is defined as esophageal pH drops below four. Esophageal pH monitoring is performed for 24 or 48 hours and at the end of recording, a patient's tracing is analyzed and the results are expressed using six standard components. Of these 6 parameters, a pH score called Composite pH Score or DeMeester Score has been calculated, which is a global measure of esophageal acid exposure. A Demeester score > 14.72 indicates reflux.

Components of 24-h Esophageal pH Monitoring
Percent total time pH < 4
Percent Upright time pH < 4
Percent Supine time pH < 4
Number of reflux episodes
Number of reflux episodes ≥ 5 min
Longest reflux episode (minutes)

== Multichannel intraluminal impedance (MII) pH monitoring ==
The widespread prescription of proton pump inhibitors (PPI) by primary care physicians has resulted in a change in pattern of GERD in patients who use these medications. Quite often gastroenterologist and foregut surgeons receive consultations to assess patients with persistent reflux symptoms despite the fact that patients is on acid suppression medications. This is due to the fact that symptoms of these patients are the results of weak acid or non-acid reflux. In 1991 Silny was the first investigator who described Multichannel Intraluminal Impedance (MII), a technique which detects intraesophageal bolus transport. This method is based on measuring the resistance to alternating current (i.e., impedance) of the content of the esophageal lumen. MII- pH monitoring was then developed by several clinical investigators. The clinical application of this technique is mainly in GERD patients who have persistent symptoms despite medical therapy.

== pH monitoring in laryngopharyngeal reflux ==
Retrograde flow of gastric contents to the upper aerodigestive tract causes a variety of symptoms such as cough, asthma and hoarseness. These respiratory manifestations of the reflux disease are commonly called laryngopharyngeal reflux (LPR) or extraesophageal reflux disease (EERD). Distal esophageal pH monitoring has been used as an objective test to establish reflux as the cause of the atypical reflux symptoms, but its role in causally associating patients' symptoms to GERD is controversial. In an effort to improve diagnostic accuracy of testing, a catheter with two pH sensors has been used to measure the degree of esophageal acid exposure in both distal and proximal esophagus. The ideal location for pH measurement to confirm the diagnosis of the laryngopharyngeal reflux is the pharynx and new studies have focused on the development of a new pH sensor which can function in the challenging environment of the oropharynx.

== See also ==
- Heidelberg test
- Impedance–pH monitoring
