= Asher Winkelstein =

American gastroenterologist

Asher Winkelstein (October 15, 1893 – May 30, 1972) was an American gastroenterologist who first described gastroesophageal reflux disease in 1935. He was a native of Syracuse, New York. He founded the gastroenterology clinic at Mount Sinai Hospital in Manhattan.
