= Aerophagia =

Excessive swallowing of air

Aerophagia (or aerophagy) is a condition of excessive air swallowing, which goes to the stomach instead of the lungs. Aerophagia may also refer to an unusual condition where the primary symptom is excessive flatulence. The actual mechanism by which air enters the gut is obscure or unknown. Aerophagia in psychiatry is sometimes attributed to nervousness or anxiety. Aerophagia affects approximately 0.1–1% of the general population, though prevalence may be underestimated due to underreporting.

== Symptoms and signs ==
- Bloating
- Chest tightness
- Nausea
- Shortness of breath
- Belching
- Heartburn
- Abdominal pain
- Hiccups
- Satiety
- Vomiting
- Diarrhea

== Causes ==
Aerophagia is associated with excessively chewing gum, smoking, drinking carbonated drinks, eating too quickly, as well as anxiety, high continuous positive airway pressure and wearing loose dentures. Aerophagia is also carried out deliberately as a voluntary action to increase the length and volume of a belch, as any air successfully swallowed serves to increase the partial pressure in the stomach and expand a burp. In people with cervical spinal blockages, inhaling can cause some air to enter the esophagus and stomach involuntarily.

== Diagnosis ==
Aerophagia is diagnosed in 8.8% of cognitively delayed patients where the coordination between swallowing and respiration is impaired and not well-defined.

Aerophagia is a dangerous potential side effect of non-invasive ventilation (NIV), commonly used in treatments of respiratory problems and cardiovascular critical care or in surgery when a general anaesthetic is required. In the case of aerophagia during NIV, it is normally diagnosed by experienced medical specialists who check on patients intermittently during NIV use for any emergent problems. The diagnosis is based on the sound heard by listening through a stethoscope placed outside the abdominal cavity. Using this approach, the problem is sometimes detected later than when it develops, possibly also later than necessary. Belated detection or response to aerophagia may lead to gastric distension, which in turn could elevate the diaphragm or cause aspiration of the stomach contents into the lungs or pneumatic rupture of the esophagus due to extreme gastric insufflation.

== See also ==
- Gastric dilatation volvulus (GDV), stretched stomach
