= Hiatal hernia =

Entrance of abdominal organs into the middle chest through the diaphragm

- Other names: Hiatus hernia
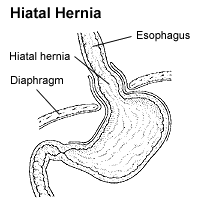
- A drawing of a hiatal hernia
- Specialty: Gastroenterology, general surgery
- Symptoms: Taste of acid in the back of the mouth, heartburn, trouble swallowing
- Complications: Iron deficiency anemia, volvulus, bowel obstruction
- Types: Sliding, paraesophageal
- Risk factors: Obesity, older age, major trauma
- Diagnostic method: Endoscopy, medical imaging, manometry
- Treatment: Raising the head of the bed, weight loss, medications, surgery
- Medication: H2 blockers, proton pump inhibitors
- Frequency: 10–80% (US)

A hiatal hernia or hiatus hernia is a type of hernia in which abdominal organs (typically the stomach) slip through the diaphragm into the middle compartment of the chest. This may result in gastroesophageal reflux disease (GERD) or laryngopharyngeal reflux (LPR) with symptoms such as a taste of acid in the back of the mouth or heartburn. Other symptoms may include trouble swallowing and chest pains. Complications may include iron deficiency anemia, volvulus, or bowel obstruction.

The most common risk factors are obesity and older age. Other risk factors include major trauma, scoliosis, and certain types of surgery. There are two main types: sliding hernia, in which the body of the stomach moves up; and paraesophageal hernia, in which an abdominal organ moves beside the esophagus. The diagnosis may be confirmed with endoscopy or medical imaging. Endoscopy is typically only required when concerning symptoms are present, symptoms are resistant to treatment, or the person is over 50 years of age.

Symptoms from a hiatal hernia may be improved by changes such as raising the head of the bed, weight loss, and adjusting eating habits. Medications that reduce gastric acid such as H2 blockers or proton pump inhibitors may also help with the symptoms. If the condition does not improve with medications, a surgery to carry out a laparoscopic fundoplication may be an option. Between 10% and 80% of adults in North America are affected.

== Signs and symptoms ==
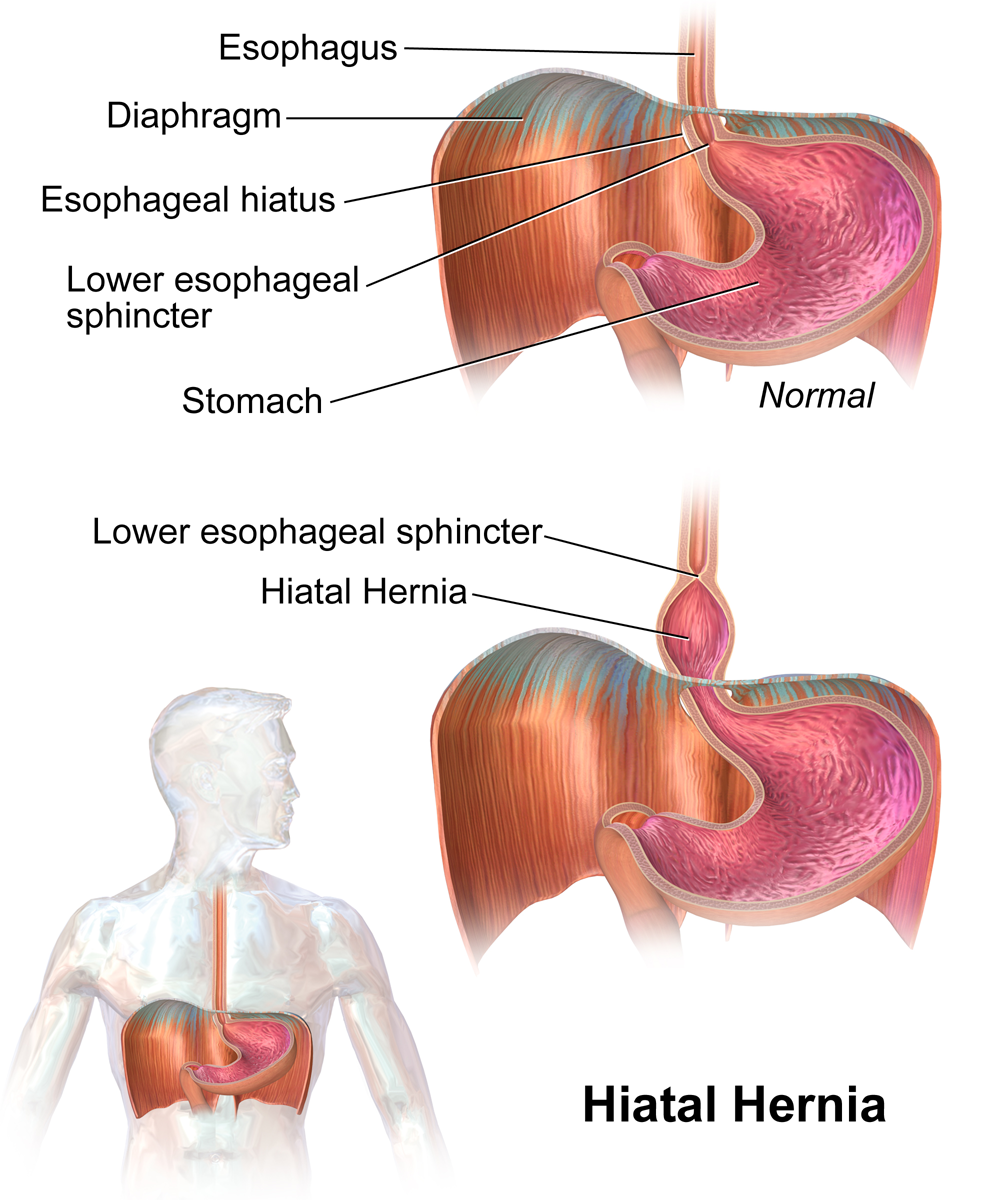
Hiatal hernia

Hiatal hernia

Hiatal hernia has often been called the "great mimic" because its symptoms can resemble many disorders. Among them, a person with a hiatal hernia can experience dull pains in the chest, shortness of breath (caused by the hernia's effect on the diaphragm), heart palpitations (due to irritation of the vagus nerve), and swallowed food "balling up" and causing discomfort in the lower esophagus until it passes on to the stomach. In addition, hiatal hernias often result in heartburn but may also cause chest pain or pain with eating.

In most cases, however, a hiatal hernia does not cause any symptoms. The pain and discomfort that a patient experiences are due to the reflux of gastric acid, air, or bile. While there are several causes of acid reflux, it occurs more frequently in the presence of a hiatal hernia.

In newborns, the presence of Bochdalek hernia can be recognised from symptoms such as difficulty breathing, fast respiration, and increased heart rate.

== Causes ==
The following are potential causes of a hiatal hernia.

- Increased pressure within the abdomen caused by:
  - Heavy lifting or bending over
  - Frequent or hard coughing
  - Hard sneezing
  - Violent vomiting
  - Straining during defecation (i.e., the Valsalva maneuver)

Obesity and age-related changes to the diaphragm are also general risk factors.

== Diagnosis ==
The diagnosis of a hiatal hernia is typically made through an upper GI series, endoscopy, high resolution manometry, esophageal pH monitoring, and computed tomography (CT). Barium swallow, as in the upper GI series, allows the size, location, stricture, and stenosis of oesophagus to be seen. It can also evaluate the oesophageal movements. Endoscopy can analyse the esophageal internal surface for erosions, ulcers, and tumours.

Meanwhile, manometry can determine the integrity of esophageal movements and the presence of esophageal achalasia. pH testing allows the quantitative analysis of acid reflux episodes. A CT scan is useful in diagnosing complications of hiatal hernia, such as gastric volvulus, perforation, pneumoperitoneum, and pneumomediastinum.

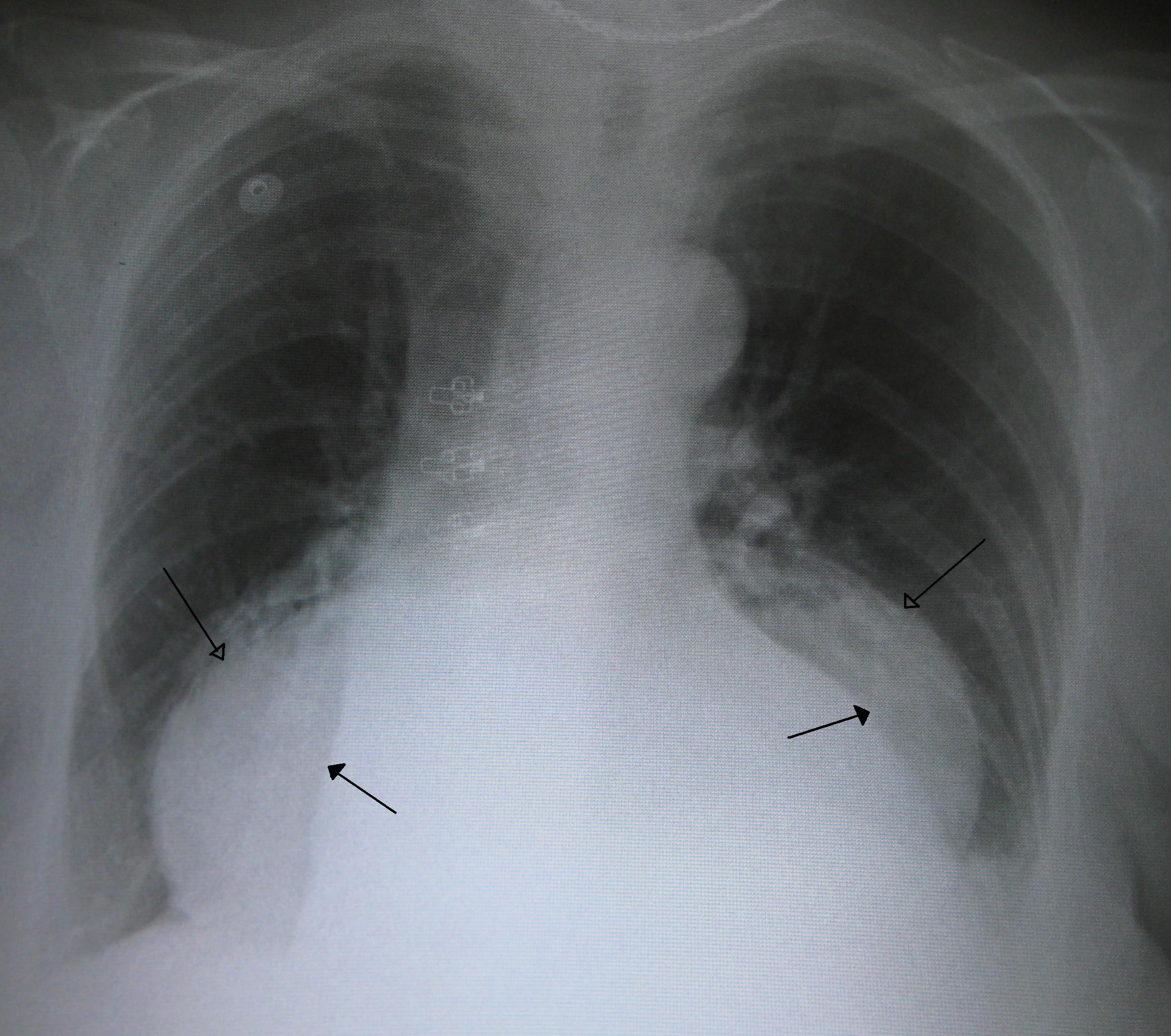
A large hiatal hernia on chest X-ray marked by open arrows in contrast to the heart borders marked by closed arrows

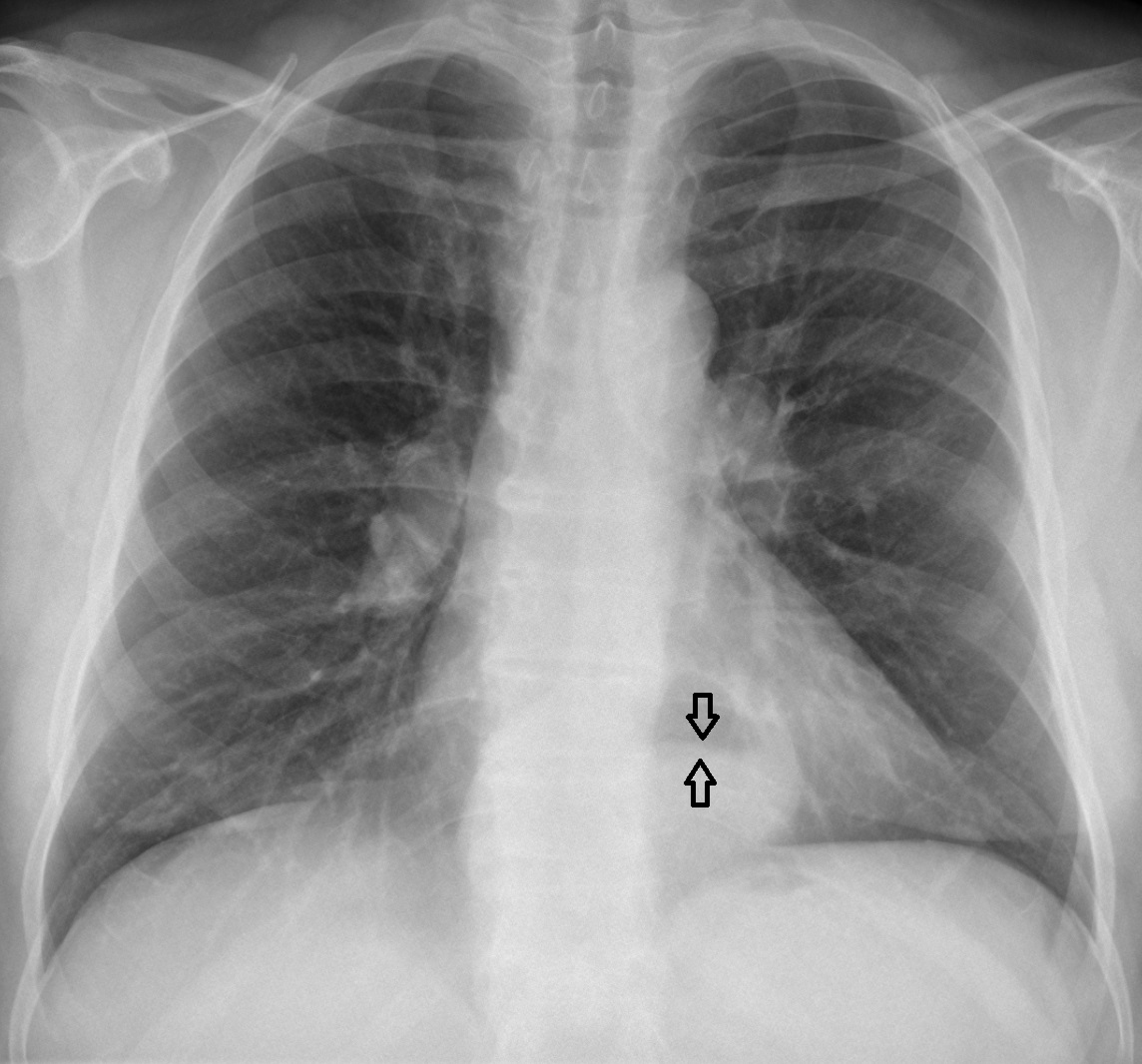
This hiatal hernia is mainly identified by an air-fluid level (labeled with arrows).

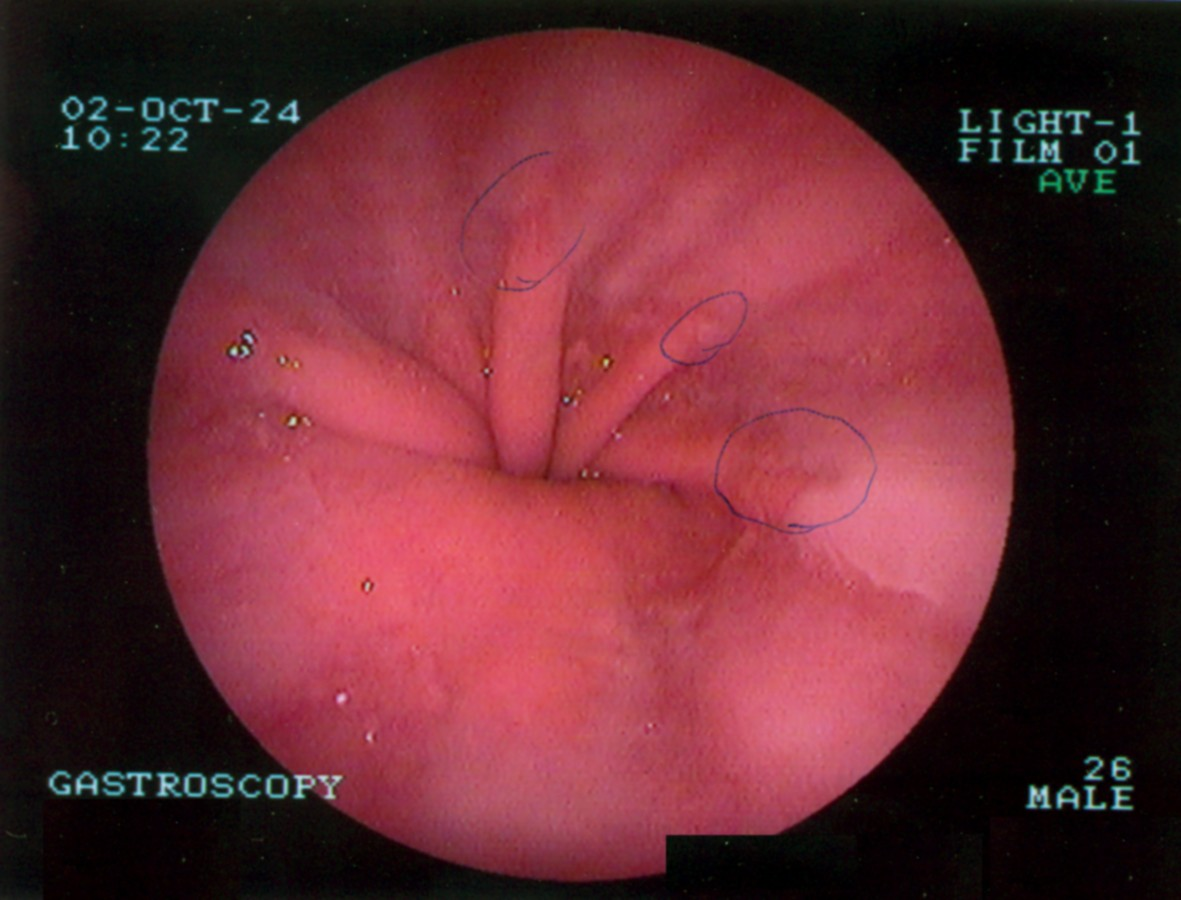
Upper GI endoscopy depicting hiatal hernia

Upper GI endoscopy in retroflexion showing Type I hiatal hernia

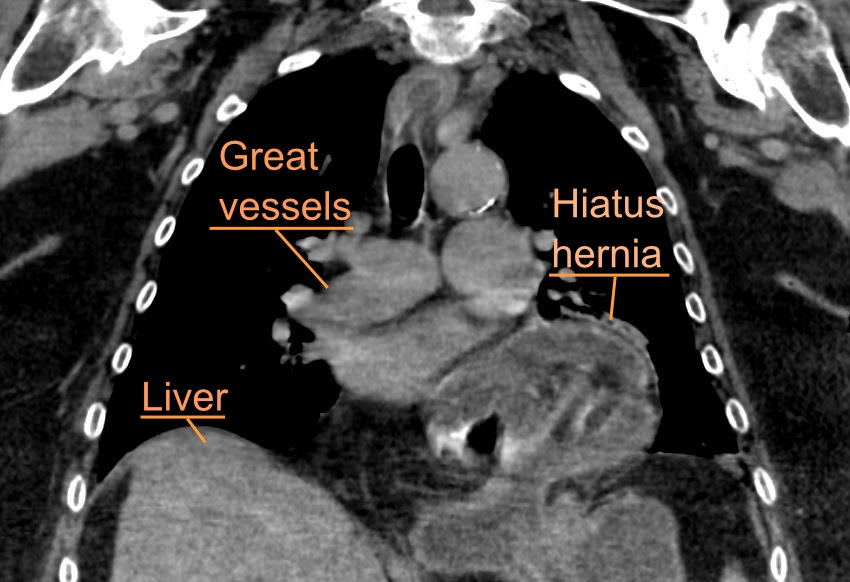
A hiatal hernia as seen on CT

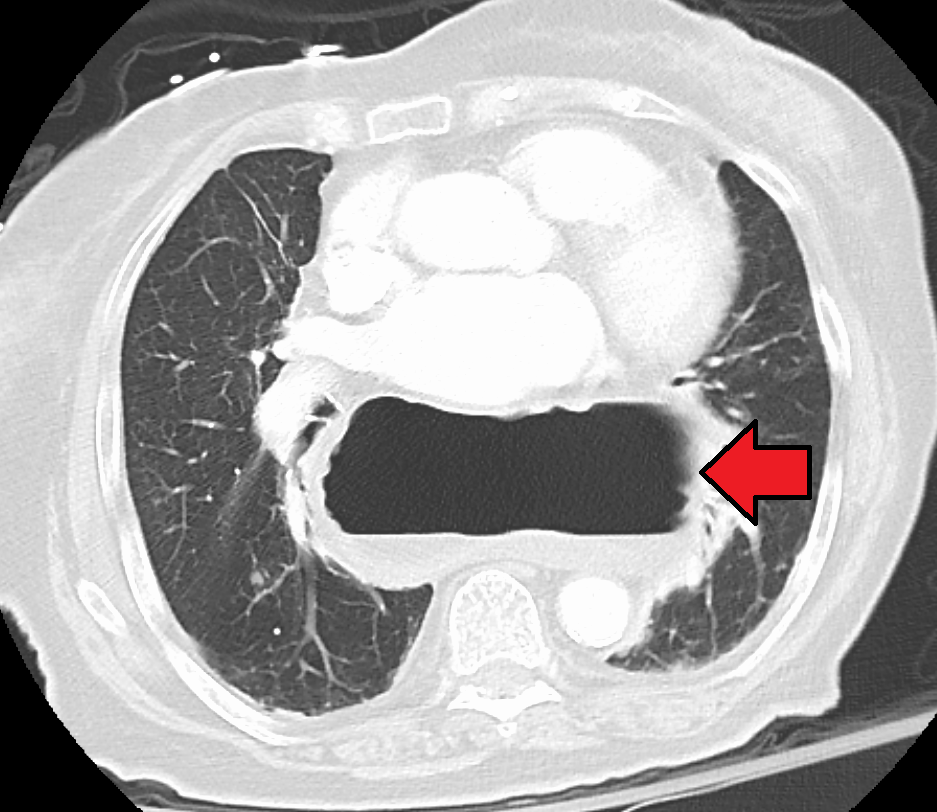
A large hiatal hernia as seen on CT imaging

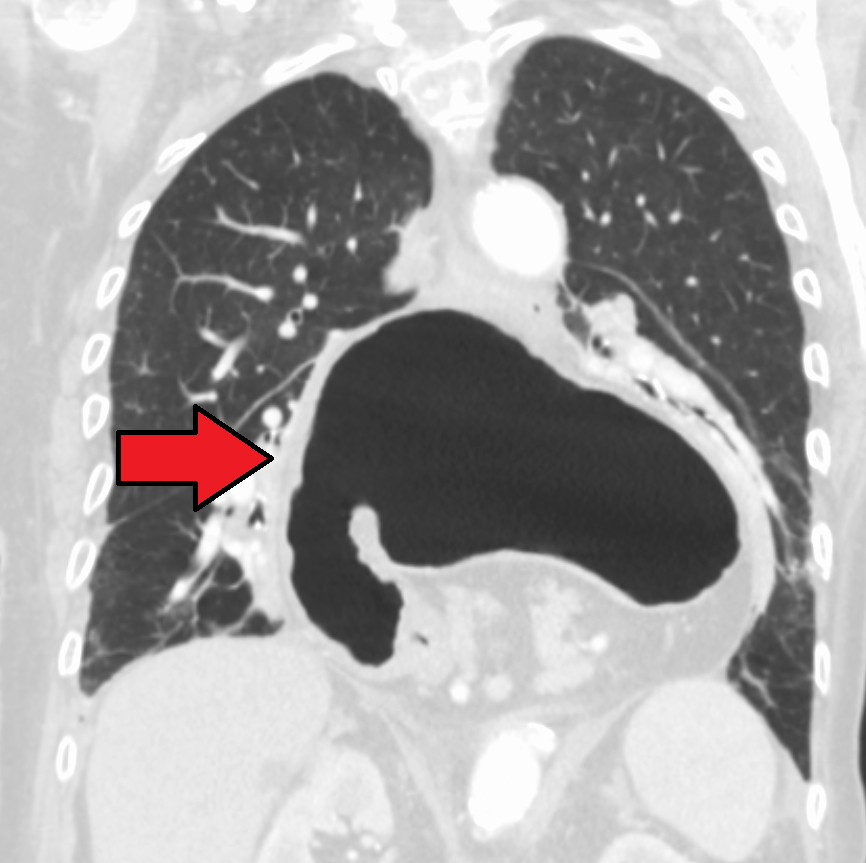
A large hiatal hernia as seen on CT imaging

As seen on ultrasound

As seen on ultrasound

=== Classification ===
Schematic diagram of different types of hiatus hernia. Green is the esophagus, red is the stomach, purple is the diaphragm, blue is the HIS-angle. A is the normal anatomy, B is a pre-stage, C is a sliding hiatal hernia, and D is a paraesophageal (rolling) type.

Four types of esophageal hiatal hernia are identified:

Type I: A type I hernia, also known as a sliding hiatal hernia, occurs when part of the stomach slides up through the hiatal opening in the diaphragm. There is a widening of the muscular hiatal tunnel and circumferential laxity of the phrenoesophageal ligament, allowing a portion of the gastric cardia to herniate upward into the posterior mediastinum. The clinical significance of type I hernias is in their association with reflux disease. Sliding hernias are the most common type and account for 95% of all hiatal hernias. (C)

Type II: A type II hernia, also known as a paraesophageal or rolling hernia, occurs when the fundus and greater curvature of the stomach roll up through the diaphragm, forming a pocket alongside the esophagus. It results from a localized defect in the phrenoesophageal ligament while the gastroesophageal junction remains fixed to the preaortic fascia and the median arcuate ligament. The gastric fundus then serves as the leading point of herniation. Although type II hernias are associated with reflux disease, their primary clinical significance lies in the potential for mechanical complications. (D)

Type III: Type III hernias have elements of both types I and II hernias. With progressive enlargement of the hernia through the hiatus, the phrenoesophageal ligament stretches, displacing the gastroesophageal junction above the diaphragm, thereby adding a sliding element to the type II hernia.

Type IV: Type IV hiatus hernia is associated with a large defect in the phrenoesophageal ligament, allowing other organs, such as the colon, spleen, pancreas, and small intestine to enter the hernia sac.

The end stage of type I and type II hernias occurs when the whole stomach migrates up into the chest by rotating 180° around its longitudinal axis, with the cardia and pylorus as fixed points. In this situation, the abnormality is usually referred to as an intrathoracic stomach.

== Treatment ==
In the great majority of cases, people experience no significant discomfort, and no treatment is required. People with symptoms should elevate the head of their beds and avoid lying down directly after meals. If the condition has been brought on by stress, stress reduction techniques may be prescribed, or if overweight, weight loss may be indicated.

=== Medications ===
Antisecretory drugs such as proton pump inhibitors and H_{2} receptor blockers can be used to reduce acid secretion. Medications that reduce the lower esophageal sphincter (LES) pressure should be avoided.

=== Procedures ===
There is tentative evidence from non-controlled trials that oral neuromuscular training may improve symptoms. This has been approved by the UK National Health Service for supply on prescription from 1 May 2022.

=== Surgery ===
In some unusual instances, as when the hiatal hernia is unusually large, or is of the paraesophageal type, it may cause esophageal stricture or severe discomfort. About 5% of hiatal hernias are paraesophageal. If symptoms from such a hernia are severe, for example, if chronic acid reflux threatens to severely injure the esophagus or is causing Barrett's esophagus, surgery is sometimes recommended. However, surgery has its risks, including death and disability, so that even for large or paraesophageal hernias, watchful waiting may, on balance, be safer and cause fewer problems than surgery. Complications from surgical procedures to correct a hiatal hernia may include gas bloat syndrome, dysphagia (trouble swallowing), dumping syndrome, excessive scarring, and rarely, achalasia. Surgical procedures sometimes fail over time, requiring a second surgery to make repairs.

One surgical procedure used is called Nissen fundoplication. In fundoplication, the gastric fundus (upper part) of the stomach is wrapped, or plicated, around the inferior part of the esophagus, preventing herniation of the stomach through the hiatus in the diaphragm and the reflux of gastric acid. The procedure is now commonly performed laparoscopically. With proper patient selection, laparoscopic fundoplication studies in the 21st century have indicated relatively low complication rates, quick recovery, and relatively good long-term results. Regarding the discussion of partial versus complete fundoplication procedures, significant variations in the postoperative outcome emphasize the increased prevalence of dysphagia after Nissen. The statistics support the superiority of laparoscopic over traditional surgery, owing to the greater aesthetic result, shorter admission time, lower costs, and faster social reintegration.

== Epidemiology ==
The incidence of hiatal hernia increases with age; approximately 60% of individuals aged 50 or older have a hiatal hernia. Of these, 9% are symptomatic, depending on the competence of the lower esophageal sphincter (LES). 95% of these are "sliding" hiatal hernias, in which the LES protrudes above the diaphragm along with the stomach, and only 5% are the "rolling" type (paraesophageal), in which the LES remains stationary, but the stomach protrudes above the diaphragm.

Hiatal hernias are most common in North America and Western Europe and rare in rural African communities. Some have proposed that insufficient dietary fiber and the use of a high sitting position for defecation may increase the risk.

== Veterinary ==
Hiatal hernia has been described in small animals since 1974, with the first case being in two dogs. It has since been reported in cats. Type I is the most common, and Type II is also common, but Types III and IV are rare, with scarce reports in the literature.

In dogs, it is estimated that 60% of cases are congenital with brachycephalic breeds being the most affected due to the oesophageal hiatus' cross-sectional area being larger than normocephalic and doliocephalic dogs. The diaphragm failing to fuse during development of the embryo is believed to be the cause of congenital hiatal hernia.

The Shar-pei and Bulldog are most commonly affected, however, no mutation or heritability has been identified as of 2023. Other risk factors for the condition include: nasal masses, laryngeal paralysis, and a narrowed intrapharyngeal opening.

Tetanus has been identified as a cause in dogs; these cases can be resolved via treating the tetanus.

Treatment of airway obstructions and feeding low-fat, more digestible food can alleviate any need for invasive procedures.
