= Gastroesophageal reflux disease =

Flow of stomach contents into the esophagus

- Other names: International: Gastro-oesophageal reflux disease (GORD); gastric reflux disease, acid reflux disease, reflux, gastroesophageal reflux
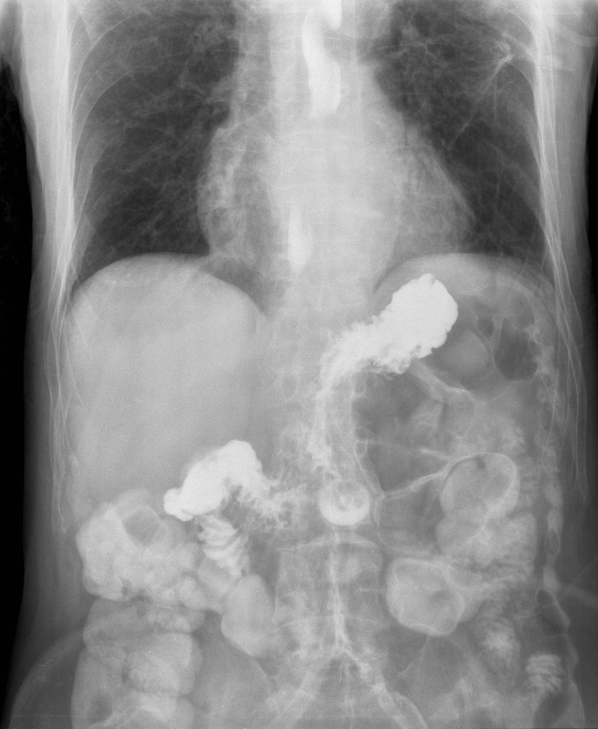
- X-ray showing radiocontrast from the stomach (white material below diaphragm) entering the esophagus (three vertical collections of white material in the mid-line of the chest) due to severe reflux
- Pronunciation: /ɡæstroʊɪˌsɒfəˈdʒiːəl ˈriːflʌks/ GORD /ɡɔːrd/ GERD /ɡɜːrd/
- Specialty: Gastroenterology
- Symptoms: Taste of acid, heartburn, bad breath, chest pain, breathing problems
- Complications: Esophagitis, esophageal strictures, Barrett's esophagus
- Duration: Long term
- Causes: Inadequate closure of the lower esophageal sphincter
- Risk factors: Obesity, pregnancy, smoking, hiatal hernia, taking certain medicines
- Diagnostic method: Gastroscopy, upper GI series, esophageal pH monitoring, esophageal manometry
- Differential diagnosis: Peptic ulcer disease, esophageal cancer, esophageal spasm, angina
- Treatment: Lifestyle changes, medications, surgery
- Medication: Antacids, H_{2} receptor blockers, proton pump inhibitors, prokinetics
- Frequency: ~15% (North American and European populations)

Gastroesophageal reflux disease (GERD) or gastro-oesophageal reflux disease (GORD) is a chronic upper gastrointestinal disease in which stomach content persistently and regularly flows up into the esophagus, resulting in symptoms and/or complications. Symptoms include heartburn, acidic taste, and feeling of regurgitation. Other symptoms can include breathing problems, dysphagia, odynophagia, non-cardiac chest pain, dental corrosion, extraesophageal symptoms such as chronic cough, hoarseness, reflux-induced laryngitis, or asthma. In the long term, and when not treated, complications such as esophagitis, esophageal stricture, and Barrett's esophagus may arise.

Risk factors include obesity, pregnancy, smoking, hiatal hernia, and taking certain medications. Medications that may cause or worsen the disease include benzodiazepines, calcium channel blockers, tricyclic antidepressants, NSAIDs, and certain asthma medicines. Acid reflux is due to poor closure of the lower esophageal sphincter, which is at the junction between the stomach and the esophagus. Diagnosis among those who do not improve with simpler measures may involve gastroscopy, upper GI series, esophageal pH monitoring, or esophageal manometry.

Treatment options include lifestyle changes, medications, and sometimes surgery for those who do not improve with the first two measures. Lifestyle changes include not lying down for three hours after eating, lying down on the left side, raising the pillow or bedhead height, losing weight, and stopping smoking. Foods that may precipitate GERD symptoms include coffee, alcohol, chocolate, fatty foods, acidic foods, and spicy foods. Medications include antacids, H_{2} receptor blockers, proton pump inhibitors, and prokinetics.

In the Western world, between 10 and 20% of the population is affected by GERD. It is highly prevalent in North America, with 18% to 28% of the population having the condition. Occasional gastroesophageal reflux without troublesome symptoms or complications is even more common. The classic symptoms of GERD were first described in 1925, when Friedenwald and Feldman commented on heartburn and its possible relationship to a hiatal hernia. In 1934, gastroenterologist Asher Winkelstein described reflux and attributed the symptoms to stomach acid.

== Signs and symptoms ==
=== Adults ===
The most common symptoms of GERD in adults are an acidic taste in the mouth, regurgitation, and heartburn. Less common symptoms include pain with swallowing/sore throat, increased salivation (also known as water brash), nausea, chest pain, coughing, and globus sensation. The acid reflux can induce asthma attack symptoms like shortness of breath, cough, and wheezing in those with underlying asthma.

GERD sometimes causes injury to the esophagus. These injuries may include one or more of the following:

- Reflux esophagitis – inflammation of esophageal epithelium which can cause ulcers near the junction of the stomach and esophagus
- Esophageal strictures – the persistent narrowing of the esophagus caused by reflux-induced inflammation
- Barrett's esophagus – intestinal metaplasia (changes of the epithelial cells from squamous to intestinal columnar epithelium) of the distal esophagus
- Esophageal adenocarcinoma – a form of cancer

GERD sometimes causes injury of the larynx (LPR). Other complications can include aspiration pneumonia.

=== Children and babies ===
GERD may be difficult to detect in infants and children since they cannot describe what they are feeling, and indicators must be observed. Symptoms may vary from typical adult symptoms. GERD in children may cause repeated vomiting, effortless spitting up, coughing, and other respiratory problems, such as wheezing. Inconsolable crying, refusing food, crying for food and then pulling off the bottle or breast only to cry for it again, failure to gain adequate weight, bad breath, and burping are also common. Children may have one symptom or many; no single symptom is universal in all children with GERD.

Of the estimated 4 million babies born in the US each year, up to 35% of them may have difficulties with reflux in the first few months of their lives, known as 'spitting up'. About 90% of infants will outgrow their reflux by their first birthday.

=== Mouth ===
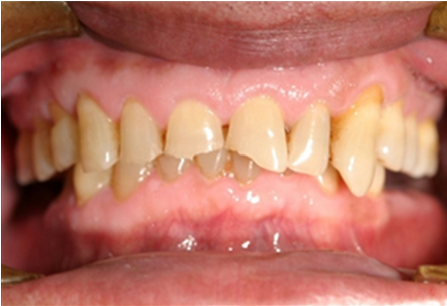
Frontal view of severe tooth erosion in GERD

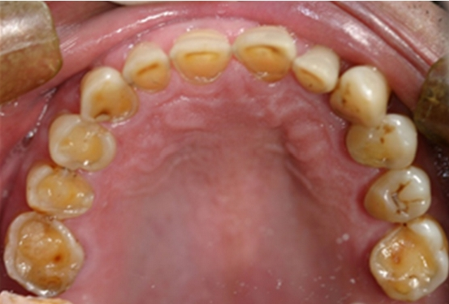
Severe tooth erosion in GERD

Acid reflux into the mouth can cause breakdown of the enamel, especially on the inside surface of the teeth. A dry mouth, acid or burning sensation in the mouth, bad breath, and redness of the palate may occur. Less common symptoms of GERD include difficulty in swallowing, water brash, chronic cough, hoarse voice, nausea and vomiting.

Signs of enamel erosion are the appearance of a smooth, silky-glazed, sometimes dull, enamel surface with the absence of perikymata, together with intact enamel along the gum margin. It will be evident in people with restorations as tooth structure typically dissolves much faster than the restorative material, causing it to seem as if it "stands above" the surrounding tooth structure.

=== Barrett's esophagus ===
GERD may lead to Barrett's esophagus, a type of intestinal metaplasia, which is in turn a precursor condition for esophageal cancer. The risk of progression from Barrett's to dysplasia is uncertain, but is estimated at 20% of cases. Due to the risk of chronic heartburn progressing to Barrett's, EGD every five years is recommended for people with chronic heartburn, or who take drugs for chronic GERD.

== Causes ==
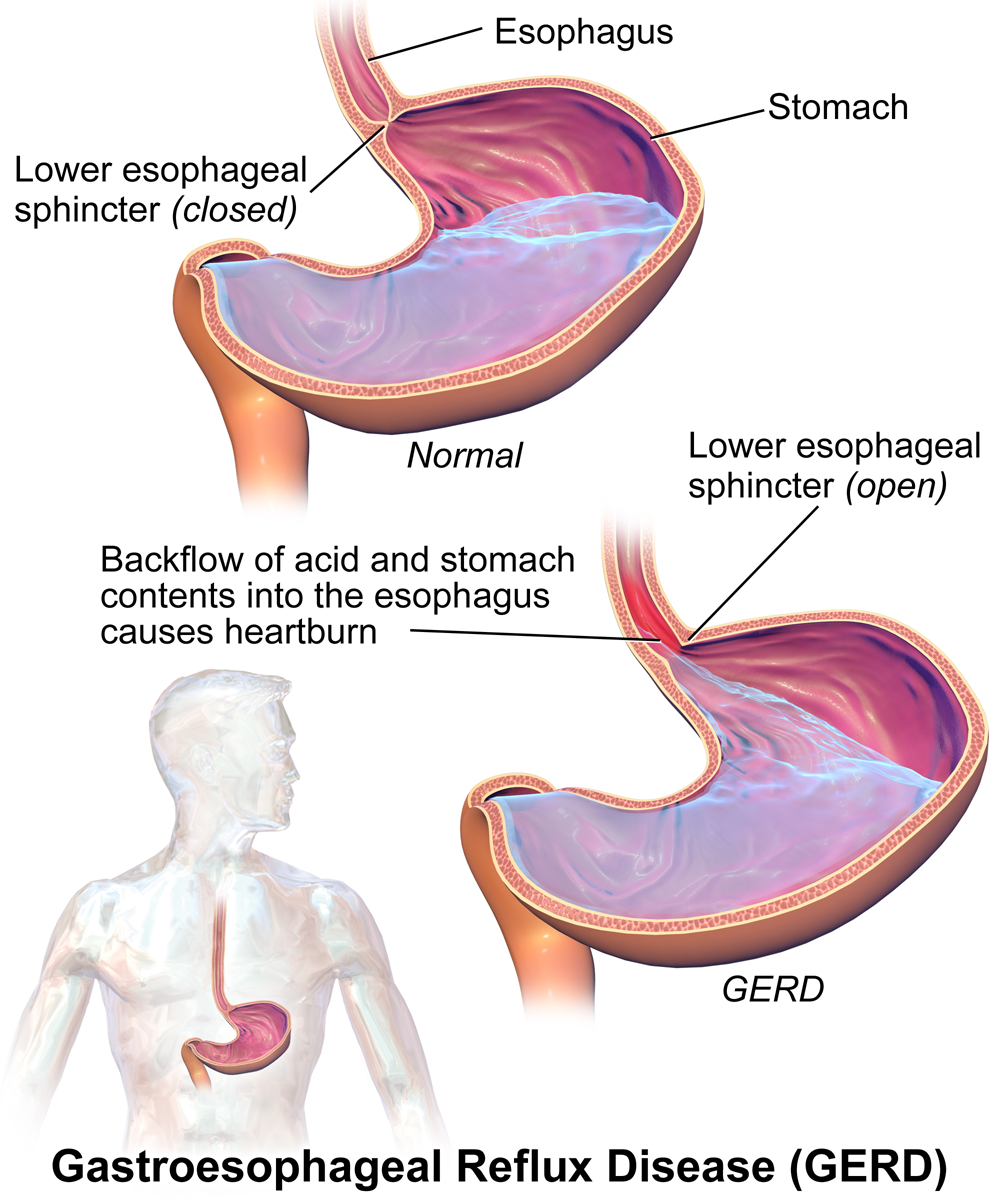
A comparison of a healthy condition to GERD

A small amount of acid reflux is typical even in healthy people (as with infrequent and minor heartburn), but gastroesophageal reflux becomes gastroesophageal reflux disease when signs and symptoms develop into a recurrent problem. Frequent acid reflux can be caused by poor closure of the lower esophageal sphincter, which is at the junction between the stomach and the esophagus.

Factors that can contribute to GERD:

- Hiatal hernia, which increases the likelihood of GERD due to mechanical and motility factors.
- Obesity: increasing body mass index is associated with more severe GERD. In a large series of 2,000 patients with symptomatic reflux disease, it has been shown that 13% of changes in esophageal acid exposure is attributable to changes in body mass index.
- GERD can be a symptom of mast cell activation syndrome (MCAS).

Factors that have been linked with GERD, but not conclusively:

- Obstructive sleep apnea
- Gallstones, which can impede the flow of bile into the duodenum, which can affect the ability to neutralize gastric acid

In 1999, a review of existing studies found that, on average, 40% of GERD patients also had H. pylori infection. The eradication of H. pylori can lead to an increase in acid secretion, leading to the question of whether H. pylori-infected GERD patients are any different from non-infected GERD patients. A double-blind study, reported in 2004, found no clinically significant difference between these two types of patients with regard to the subjective or objective measures of disease severity.

The etiology of GERD appears to include the reflux of bile from the stomach into the esophagus, leading to the production of reactive oxygen species and oxidative stress and then inflammation and induction of DNA damage. In experimental models of GERD it was found that Lactobacilli facilitate the repair of such DNA damage indicating that administration of these potentially probiotic bacteria may be useful in patients with GERD for preventing progression to Barrett's esophagus and esophageal adenocarcinoma.

Intraoperative gastroesophageal reflux (GER) in dogs is a frequent complication during general anaesthesia that may lead to esophagitis, oesophageal strictures, regurgitation, and potentially cause aspiration pneumonia. The prevalence of GER varies substantially between different studies, with a large number of studies reporting an incidence of approximately 40 to 60% when using a combination of an opioid and a sedative before elective non-abdominal surgery.

== Diagnosis ==
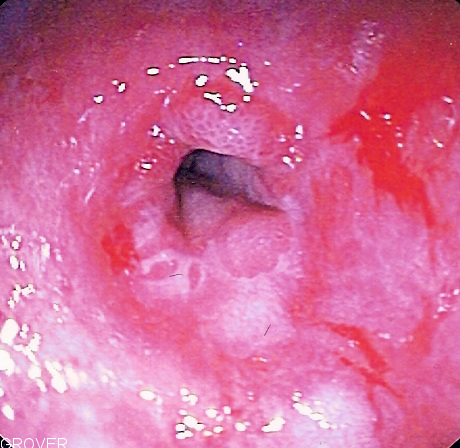
Endoscopic image of peptic stricture, or narrowing of the esophagus near the junction with the stomach: This is a complication of chronic gastroesophageal reflux disease and can be a cause of dysphagia or difficulty swallowing.

The diagnosis of GERD is usually made when typical symptoms are present. Reflux can be present in people without symptoms, and the diagnosis requires both symptoms or complications and reflux of stomach content.

Other investigations may include esophagogastroduodenoscopy (EGD). Barium swallow X-rays should not be used for diagnosis. Esophageal manometry is not recommended for use in the diagnosis, being recommended only before surgery. Ambulatory esophageal pH monitoring may be useful in those who do not improve after PPIs and is not needed in those in whom Barrett's esophagus is seen. Investigation for H. pylori is not usually needed.

The current gold standard for the diagnosis of GERD is esophageal pH monitoring. It is the most objective test to diagnose reflux disease and allows monitoring GERD patients in their response to medical or surgical treatment. One practice for the diagnosis of GERD is a short-term treatment with proton-pump inhibitors, with improvement in symptoms suggesting a positive diagnosis. Short-term treatment with proton-pump inhibitors may help predict abnormal 24-hour pH monitoring results among patients with symptoms suggestive of GERD.

=== Endoscopy ===
Endoscopy, the examination of the stomach with a fibre-optic scope, is not routinely needed if the case is typical and responds to treatment. It is recommended when people either do not respond well to treatment or have alarm symptoms, including dysphagia, anemia, blood in the stool (detected chemically), wheezing, weight loss, or voice changes. Some physicians advocate either once-in-a-lifetime or 5- to 10-yearly endoscopy for people with longstanding GERD, to evaluate the possible presence of dysplasia or Barrett's esophagus.

Biopsies performed during gastroscopy may show:

- Edema and basal hyperplasia (nonspecific inflammatory changes)
- Lymphocytic inflammation (nonspecific)
- Neutrophilic inflammation (usually due to reflux or Helicobacter gastritis)
- Eosinophilic inflammation (usually due to reflux): The presence of intraepithelial eosinophils may suggest a diagnosis of eosinophilic esophagitis (EE) if eosinophils are present in high enough numbers. Less than 20 eosinophils per high-power microscopic field in the distal esophagus, in the presence of other histologic features of GERD, is more consistent with GERD than EE.
- Goblet cell intestinal metaplasia or Barrett's esophagus
- Elongation of the papillae
- Thinning of the squamous cell layer
- Dysplasia
- Carcinoma

Reflux changes that are not erosive in nature lead to "nonerosive reflux disease".

=== Severity ===
Severity may be documented with the Johnson-DeMeester's scoring system:

- 0 – None
- 1 – Minimal – occasional episodes
- 2 – Moderate – medical therapy visits
- 3 – Severe – interference with daily activities

=== Differential diagnosis ===
Other causes of chest pain, such as heart disease, should be ruled out before making the diagnosis. Another kind of acid reflux, which causes respiratory and laryngeal signs and symptoms, is called laryngopharyngeal reflux (LPR) or extraesophageal reflux disease (EERD). Unlike GERD, LPR rarely produces heartburn, and is sometimes called silent reflux. Differential diagnosis of GERD can also include dyspepsia, peptic ulcer disease, esophageal and gastric cancer, and food allergies.

== Treatment ==
The treatments for GERD may include food choices, lifestyle changes, medications, and possibly surgery. Initial treatment is frequently with a proton-pump inhibitor such as omeprazole. In some cases, a person with GERD symptoms can manage them by taking over-the-counter drugs. This is often safer and less expensive than taking prescription drugs. Some guidelines recommend trying to treat symptoms with an H_{2} antagonist before using a proton-pump inhibitor because of cost and safety concerns.

=== Medical nutrition therapy and lifestyle changes ===
Medical nutrition therapy plays an essential role in managing the symptoms of the disease by preventing reflux, preventing pain and irritation, and decreasing gastric secretions.

Some foods, such as chocolate, mint, high-fat foods, and alcohol, have been shown to relax the lower esophageal sphincter, increasing the risk of reflux. Weight loss is recommended for the overweight or obese, as well as avoidance of bedtime snacks or lying down immediately after meals (meals should occur at least 2–3 hours before bedtime), elevation of the head of the bed on 6-inch blocks, avoidance of smoking, and avoidance of tight clothing that increases pressure in the stomach. It may be beneficial to avoid spices, citrus juices, tomatoes, and soft drinks, and to consume small, frequent meals and drink liquids between meals. Some evidence suggests that reduced sugar intake and increased fiber intake can help. Although moderate exercise may improve symptoms in people with GERD, vigorous exercise may worsen them. Breathing exercises may relieve GERD symptoms.

=== Medications ===
The primary medications used for GERD are proton-pump inhibitors, H_{2} receptor blockers and antacids with or without alginic acid. The use of acid suppression therapy is a common response to GERD symptoms and many people get more of this kind of treatment than their case merits. The overuse of acid suppression is a problem because of the side effects and costs.

==== Proton-pump inhibitors ====
Proton-pump inhibitors (PPIs), such as omeprazole, are the most effective, followed by H_{2} receptor blockers. If a once-daily PPI is only partially effective, it may be used twice a day. They should be taken one-half to one hour before a meal. There is no significant difference between PPIs. When these medications are used long-term, the lowest effective dose should be taken. They may also be taken only when symptoms occur in those with frequent problems. H_{2} receptor blockers lead to roughly a 40% improvement.

==== Antacids ====
The evidence for antacids is weaker with a benefit of about 10% (NNT=13) while a combination of an antacid and alginic acid (such as Gaviscon) may improve symptoms by 60% (NNT=4). Metoclopramide (a prokinetic) is not recommended either alone or in combination with other treatments due to concerns around adverse effects. The benefit of the prokinetic mosapride is modest.

==== Other agents ====
Sucralfate has similar effectiveness to H_{2} receptor blockers; however, sucralfate needs to be taken multiple times a day, thus limiting its use. Baclofen, an agonist of the GABA_{B} receptor, while effective, has similar issues of needing frequent dosing in addition to greater adverse effects compared to other medications.

=== Surgery ===
The standard surgical treatment for severe GERD is the Nissen fundoplication. In this procedure, the upper part of the stomach is wrapped around the lower esophageal sphincter to strengthen the sphincter and prevent acid reflux and to repair a hiatal hernia. It is recommended only for those who do not improve with PPIs. Quality of life is improved in the short term compared to medical therapy, but there is uncertainty in the benefits of surgery versus long-term medical management with proton pump inhibitors. When comparing different fundoplication techniques, partial posterior fundoplication surgery is more effective than partial anterior fundoplication surgery, and partial fundoplication has better outcomes than total fundoplication.

Esophagogastric dissociation is an alternative procedure that is sometimes used to treat neurologically impaired children with GERD. Preliminary studies have shown it may have a lower failure rate and a lower incidence of recurrent reflux.

In 2012, the U.S. Food and Drug Administration (FDA) approved a device called the LINX, which consists of a series of metal beads with magnetic cores that are placed surgically around the lower esophageal sphincter, for those with severe symptoms that do not respond to other treatments. Improvement of GERD symptoms is similar to that of the Nissen fundoplication, although there is no data regarding long-term effects. Compared to Nissen fundoplication procedures, the procedure has shown a reduction in complications such as gas bloat syndrome that commonly occur. Adverse responses include difficulty swallowing, chest pain, vomiting, and nausea. Contraindications that would advise against use of the device are patients who are or may be allergic to titanium, stainless steel, nickel, or ferrous iron materials. A warning advises that the device should not be used by patients who could be exposed to, or undergo, magnetic resonance imaging (MRI) because of serious injury to the patient and damage to the device.

Some patients who are at an increased surgical risk or do not tolerate PPIs may qualify for a more recently developed incisionless procedure known as a TIF transoral incisionless fundoplication. Benefits of this procedure may last for up to six years.

=== Special populations ===
==== Pregnancy ====
GERD is a common condition that develops during pregnancy, but usually resolves after delivery. The severity of symptoms tends to increase throughout the pregnancy. In pregnancy, dietary modifications and lifestyle changes may be attempted, but often have little effect. Some lifestyle changes that can be implemented are elevating the head of the bed, eating small portions of food at regularly scheduled intervals, reducing fluid intake with a meal, avoiding eating three hours before bedtime, and refraining from lying down after eating. Calcium-based antacids are recommended if these changes are not effective; aluminum- and magnesium hydroxide-based antacids are also safe. Antacids that contain sodium bicarbonate or magnesium trisilicate should be avoided in pregnancy. Sucralfate has been studied in pregnancy and proven to be safe as is cimetidine and PPIs.

==== Babies ====
Babies may see relief with smaller, more frequent feedings, more frequent burping during feedings, holding the baby in an upright position 30 minutes after feeding, keeping the baby's head elevated while laying on the back, removing milk and soy from the mother's diet or feeding the baby milk protein-free formula. They may also be treated with medicines such as PPIs or H_{2} receptor blockers. PPIs, however, have not been found to be effective in this population and there is a lack of evidence for safety.

The role of an occupational therapist with an infant with GERD includes positioning during and after feeding. One technique used is called the log-roll technique, which is practiced when changing an infant's clothing or diapers. Placing an infant on their back while having their legs lifted is not recommended since it causes the acid to flow back up the esophagus. Instead, the occupational therapist would suggest rolling the child on the side, keeping the shoulders and hips aligned to avoid acid rising up the baby's esophagus. Another technique used is feeding the baby on their side with an upright position instead of lying flat on their back. The final positioning technique used for infants is to keep them on their stomach or upright for 20 minutes after feeding.

== Epidemiology ==
In Western populations, GERD affects approximately 10% to 20% of the population, and 0.4% newly develop the condition. For instance, an estimated 3.4 million to 6.8 million Canadians have GERD. The prevalence rate of GERD in developed nations is also tightly linked with age, with adults aged 60 to 70 being the most commonly affected. In the United States 20% of people have symptoms in a given week and 7% every day. No data supports sex predominance concerning GERD.

== History ==
An obsolete treatment is vagotomy ("highly selective vagotomy"), the surgical removal of vagus nerve branches that innervate the stomach lining. This treatment has been largely replaced by medication. Vagotomy by itself tended to worsen the contraction of the pyloric sphincter of the stomach and delay stomach emptying. Historically, vagotomy was combined with pyloroplasty or gastroenterostomy to counter this problem.

== Research ==
Several endoscopic devices have been tested to treat chronic heartburn.

- Endocinch puts stitches in the lower esophageal sphincter (LES) to create small pleats to help strengthen the muscle. However, long-term results were disappointing, and the device is no longer sold by Bard.
- The Stretta procedure uses electrodes to apply radio-frequency energy to the LES. A 2015 systematic review and meta-analysis in response to the systematic review (no meta-analysis) conducted by SAGES did not support the claims that Stretta was an effective treatment for GERD. A 2012 systematic review found that it improves GERD symptoms.
- NDO Surgical Plicator creates a plication, or fold, of tissue near the gastroesophageal junction, and fixates the plication with a suture-based implant. The company ceased operations in mid-2008, and the device is no longer on the market.
- Transoral incisionless fundoplication, which uses a device called Esophyx, may be effective.

== See also ==
- Acid perfusion test
- EndoStim Electrical Stimulation Therapy
- Esophageal motility disorder
- Esophageal motility study
