= List of medical abbreviations: B =

Sortable table
| Abbreviation | Meaning |
|---|---|
| B_{x} | biopsy |
| Ba | barium |
| BAC | blood alcohol content |
| BAD | bipolar affective disorder |
| BADLs | basic ADLs basic activities of daily living |
| BAL | bronchoalveolar lavage British anti-Lewisite blood alcohol level |
| BAO | basic acid output |
| BAT | brown adipose tissue |
| BAV | bicuspid aortic valve |
| BBA | bilateral breast augmentation |
| BBB | blood–brain barrier |
| BBB L | left bundle branch block |
| BBB R | right bundle branch block |
| BBPS | Boston Bowel Preparation Scale |
| BBT | basal body temperature |
| BC | bone conduction blood culture Board certified |
| BCC | basal cell carcinoma blind carbon copy |
| BCG | bacille Calmette–Guérin (a tuberculosis vaccination) |
| BCP | birth control pill |
| BCP | blood chemistry profile |
| BCX; BCx | blood culture |
| BDR | Background Diabetic Retinopathy |
| BBMF | "bone break, me fix" (orthopedic consent form) |
| BD | bipolar disorder twice a day (from Latin bis in die) |
| BDD | body dysmorphic disorder |
| BDI | Beck Depression Inventory |
| BDS | two times a day (from Latin bis die sumendus) |
| BE | barium enema base excess |
| BEAM | A type of high-dose chemotherapy used to treat lymphoma prior to a stem cell transplant |
| BEP | bleomycin, etoposide, and cisplatin (chemotherapy regimen) |
| BF | breastfeeding |
| BFP | bundle forming pilus |
| BG | blood glucose |
| BGAT | blood glucose awareness training (to help patients with diabetic hypoglycemia) |
| BGL | blood glucose level |
| BIB | brought in by |
| BIBA | brought in by ambulance |
| BID bid b.i.d. | twice a day (from Latin bis in die) |
| Bilat eq | bilaterally equal |
| BiPAP | bilevel positive airway pressure |
| BIS | bispectral index |
| BiVAD | bilateral ventricular assist device (left and right) |
| BK | bradykinin |
| BKA | below-the-knee amputation |
| b/l | bilateral |
| BL | Burkitt's lymphoma |
| bl.cult | blood culture |
| bld | blood |
| BLE | Bilateral Lower Extremity (in/on both legs). |
| BLS | basic life support |
| BM | bone marrow bowel movement breast milk Capillary blood glucose (British medical colloquialism originating from Boehringer Mannheim, a manufacturer of early glucose meters, today a part of Boehringer Ingelheim.) |
| BMBx | Bone marrow biopsy |
| BMC | bone mineral content |
| BMD | bone mineral density (also termed bone mass measurement) |
| BMI | body mass index |
| BMP | basic metabolic panel |
| BMR | basal metabolic rate |
| BMS | bare-metal stent |
| BMT | bone marrow transplantation |
| BNO | bowel not open |
| BNP | brain natriuretic peptide |
| BO | bowel open |
| B/O | because of |
| BOA | born out of asepsis |
| BOI | born on island (i.e. a local patient) |
| BOLT | Bilateral Orthotopic Lung Transplant |
| BOM | bilateral otitis media |
| BOOP | bronchiolitis obliterans organizing pneumonia |
| BP | blood pressure British Pharmacopoeia |
| BPAD | bipolar affective disorder |
| BPCA | best pharmaceuticals for children act |
| BPD | biparietal diameter borderline personality disorder bronchopulmonary dysplasia |
| BPES | blepharophimosis, ptosis, epicanthus inversus syndrome |
| BPH | benign prostatic hyperplasia/benign prostatic hypertrophy |
| BPM | beats per minute |
| BPP | biophysical profile |
| BPPV | benign paroxysmal positional vertigo |
| BPSD | behavioural and psychological symptoms of dementia |
| BR | bedrest bathroom |
| BRA | bilateral renal agenesis |
| BRAT | The BRAT diet: bananas, rice, applesauce, toast (helps digestion in some GI disorders) |
| BRATY | another version of the BRAT diet: bananas, rice, applesauce, toast, yogurt (helps digestion in some GI disorders) |
| BRB | bright red blood (color is important as an indicator of source, for example in gastrointestinal bleeding) |
| BRBPR | bright red blood per rectum |
| BRCA1 (gene); BRCA1 (protein) | breast cancer 1 (a human gene and its protein) |
| BRCA2 (gene); BRCA2 (protein) | breast cancer 2 (a human gene and its protein) |
| BRP | bathroom privileges |
| BRTO | Balloon-Occluded Retrograde Transvenous Obliteration |
| BRUE | brief resolved unexplained event |
| BRVO | Branch retinal vein occlusion |
| BS | barium swallow breath breath sound bowel sounds (on auscultation using a stethoscope) blood sugar body secretions |
| BS x 4 quads | bowel signs in all 4 quadrants (also sometimes "BS + all 4 quads") |
| BS_{x} | B-symptoms |
| BSA | body surface area bovine serum albumin |
| BSC | bedside commode |
| BSE | bovine spongiform encephalopathy breast self-examination |
| BSL | blood sugar level |
| BSO | bilateral salpingo-oophorectomy |
| BSP | bromsulphthalein |
| BSU | Bartholin, Skene and urethra (glands) |
| BT | bleeding time brachytherapy |
| BTB | breakthrough bleeding of menstrual period |
| BTL | bilateral tubal ligation |
| BTP | breakthrough pain |
| BTT | bridge to transplantation |
| BUN | blood urea nitrogen |
| BV | bacterial vaginosis |
| BVM | bag valve mask (Ambu bag) |
| BVP | biventricular pacing (see artificial pacemaker) bleomycin, vincristine, and cisplatin (chemotherapy regimen) |
| BW | blood work (blood tests) birth weight |
| BWS | Beckwith-Wiedemann syndrome |
| Bx | biopsy |
| BZDs | benzodiazepines |
