= Low-fiber/low-residue diet =

Diet that limits stool

A low-residue diet is a diet which aims to reduce the amount of residue, which is the indigestible material remaining in the large intestine after digestion of food. Since this residue contributes to fecal bulking, a low-residue diet in theory reduces the quantity of feces and frequency of defecation.

It may be prescribed for patients with ailments or functional gastrointestinal disorders mitigated by fewer and smaller bowel movements each day. Most often the diet is used as part of bowel preparation before colonoscopy. The low-residue diet is not usually intended to be a long term diet. It may also be used as a short-term therapy for acute stages of gastrointestinal illnesses such as Crohn's disease, diverticulitis, bowel obstruction, and ulcerative colitis. In addition, a low-residue diet is often prescribed before and/or after abdominal surgery or cancer treatments.

A low-fiber diet is a low-residue diet eliminating dietary fiber in particular. The terms are not always distinguished, but when they are, a low-residue diet will include additional restrictions on foods such as dairy products, which do not contain fiber but do develop residue after digestion.

If the problem lies with fermentable carbohydrates instead, the patient may be directed to a low-FODMAP diet. Some monotrophic diets, such as the carnivore diet, are implicitly low-residue, but may also sacrifice nutrition.

== Terminology ==
Often the terms low-fiber diet and low-residue diet are incorrectly treated as identical, but some make a distinction based on the difference between fiber and residue.

Dietary fiber is the indigestible part of food made from plants. The fiber content of a given type of food may be estimated using food composition data.

Residue (also termed intestinal residue or colonic residue) is the indigestible material remaining in the gastrointestinal tract after digestion. The bulk of residue is made from fiber. However, residue consists of not only fiber but also microorganisms (e.g., bacteria), secretions, and cells which are shed from the mucosa (the lining of the gut) after digestion. Normal function of a healthy digestive system and any type of food may cause varying degrees of residue. It is difficult to consistently estimate the exact volume of reside generated by individual types of food. This is because there is individual variation in the gut microbiota and bowel function, meaning that the same quantity and type of food may generate different amounts of residue in different people.

Therefore, a low-fiber diet simply reduces fiber intake by eliminating or limiting high-fiber foods such as raw fruits and vegetables. A low-residue diet restricts high-fiber foods, but also includes restrictions on foods such as dairy products, which do not contain fiber but do develop residue after digestion. Restriction of milk has been considered the main difference between a low-residue diet and a low-fiber diet. A low-fiber diet is less restrictive, allowing a greater variety of foods compared to a low-residue diet. For example, eggs are permitted on a low-fiber diet, but only hard boiled eggs on a low-residue diet. Cooked, peeled, or blended fruits and vegetables are permitted on a low-fiber diet, but most fruits and vegetables (apart from banana and melon) are restricted on a low-residue diet.

A low-residue diet is sometimes termed a bland diet, but the goals of a bland diet are wider than reducing fiber intake. A bland diet also aims to be easy to digest, not acidic or spicy, and not to cause flatulence or other gastrointestinal symptoms.

The Academy of Nutrition and Dietetics removed the low-residue diet from its Nutrition Care Manual because there is no scientifically accepted, quantitative definition of residue and there is no accurate method to determine the residue produced by a given type of food. There is also very little evidence that a low-residue diet has beneficial effects on gastrointestinal health. Despite this, it continues to be used. Low-fiber diets are not recommended long-term as they are associated with an increased risk of colorectal cancer.

== Dietary guidelines ==
=== Standard guidelines ===
There is no standardization of exactly what constitutes a low-residue diet. However, most low-residue diets make the following recommendations:

Food type	Eat/Drink	Avoid
Grains	Breads and other baked goods made from refined white flour	Whole grain breads and baked goods
	Cold cereals made from refined flours, such as cornflakes and rice krispies	Whole grain cereals such as bran flakes
	White rice, noodles, refined pasta	Brown rice, whole wheat pasta, and other whole grain foods
Fruits	Fruit juices without pulp, except prune juice	Juices with pulp or seed, prune juice
	Soft fruits such as bananas and melons	Dried fruits, berries
	Canned or well-cooked fruit	Coconuts, popcorn
Vegetables	Vegetable juices without pulp	Juices with pulp or seed
	Potatoes without skin	Potato skins
	Canned or well-cooked vegetables	
Meat, Other Protein	Well-cooked tender meat, fish, poultry, eggs	Tough meat, meat with gristle
		Beans, peas, legumes, nuts
Dairy	Milk	All dairy if lactose intolerant
	Soft, mild cheeses	Strong cheeses
	Plain yoghurt	Yoghurt or cheese containing nuts, berries, raw fruit
Oils	Vegetable oils, margarine, butter	Fried foods

=== Variations ===
==== Quantity of fiber ====
A low-fiber diet is not a no-fiber diet. A 2015 review article recommends less than 10 grams of fiber per day. Other sources recommend that a patient on a low-fiber diet eat no more than 10–15 grams of fiber per day. Some sources recommend serving sizes that contain no more than 2 grams per serving.

==== Grains ====
Some diets recommend limiting servings of baked goods to 2 grams per serving. Other diets recommend limiting these servings to just 1 gram per serving. Most diets also recommend eating warm cereals such as cream of wheat, cream of rice, grits, and farina.

==== Fruits ====
Some diets allow additional raw fruits such as very soft apricot, canned fruit cocktail, grapes, peaches, papayas, plums, or citrus fruits without membrane, but two rule out all raw fruits. Some allow applesauce, other fruit sauces, or peeled and well-cooked apples.

==== Vegetables ====
Many diets specifically recommend tomato sauce and prohibit pickles. Two diets actually limit the well-cooked vegetables to yellow squash without seeds, green beans, wax beans, spinach, pumpkin, eggplant, asparagus, beets, and carrots. Two diets allow some raw vegetables: lettuce, cucumber (without seeds), and zucchini.

==== Meat and other proteins ====
Some diets allow smooth peanut butter or smooth nut butters. Some diets allow tofu.

==== Dairy ====
Some diets limit dairy to 2 cups per day. One diet allows 1.5 ounces (40 g) of hard cheese. Several diets allow pudding or custard, sherbet, whipped cream, or ice cream. A couple of diets suggest specific lactose-free products for the lactose intolerant, such as soy milk or whipped cream. One diet prohibits whole milk, half and half, cream, sour cream, and regular ice cream. Milk does not contain fiber but is a medium-residue food which still contributes to residue.

==== Condiments and spreads ====
Some diets allow mayonnaise, ketchup, sour cream, cream cheese, smooth sauces and salad dressings, plain gravies, or whipped cream. Several diets allow jelly, honey, and syrup. Many prohibit jam, marmalade, and preserves.

Several diets prohibit highly spiced food, but some allow spices, cooked herbs, and seasonings.

==== Beverages ====
Several diets specifically prohibit caffeine (two of these allow decaffeinated coffee, tea, and other drinks), but some allow coffee, tea, and carbonated drinks.

==== Nutritional quality ====
The low-residue diet is not usually intended to be a long term diet. The intake of fruits and vegetables may not provide adequate amounts of vitamin C and folic acid. The quantity of calcium may also be inadequate if dairy products are restricted. In these cases, a multivitamin supplement or liquid nutritional supplement may be needed.

== Uses ==
A low-fiber / low-residue diet may be used to prepare for or recover from various medical procedures:

- Abdominal surgery
- Colonoscopy
- Internal hemorrhoid surgery

It may also be used during acute stages of the following conditions, to rest the bowels:

- Bowel inflammation
- Inflammatory bowel disease (Crohn's disease, ulcerative colitis)
- Diverticulitis
- Radiation therapy to the pelvis and lower bowel (e.g., radiation enteropathy)
- Chemotherapy
- Gastroparesis
- Irritable bowel syndrome
- Severe diarrhea.

=== Colonoscopy ===
The most common preparation for a colonoscopy is a clear liquid diet accompanied by laxatives. However, this may not be the most effective preparation. A 2015 guideline issued by The Standards of Practice Committee of the American Society for Gastrointestinal Endoscopy recommends using a low-residue diet instead, also accompanied by laxatives, because of evidence that it performs at least as well for bowel cleansing and is associated with better patient satisfaction.

=== Inflammatory bowel disease ===
Sometimes a low residue diet is used during flare-ups of inflammatory bowel disease with the intention of reducing stool output and frequency of bowel movements, but there is little evidence for the effectiveness of this.

=== Diverticulitis ===
While a low-fiber diet is generally used for acute diverticulitis, the NIH guidelines recommend a high-fiber diet for patients with diverticulosis (a condition that may lead to diverticulitis). A Mayo Clinic review from 2011 showed that a high-fiber diet can prevent diverticular disease.

=== Gastroparesis ===
There is emerging evidence that low-residue diets reduce symptoms such as acid reflux in gastroparesis.

=== Aviation and space flight ===
In preparation for long-duration, toiletless military flights, the crew is sometimes instructed to have a low-residue meal as their last meal before the flight. For example, this was the case with Blackbird pilots. Low-residue diets are also sometimes used as part of preparation for space flights.
