= BRP =

BRP can mean:

== Culture ==
- Basic Role-Playing game system
- Bathroom privileges
- "B.R.P.", song by Victor Jara on album El derecho de vivir en paz
- Brioche-purl stitch, in brioche knitting

== Organizations ==
- Bombo Radyo Philippines, Philippine radio network
- British Racing Partnership, former British motor racing team
- BRP Inc., Canadian company
- Brotherhood of Russian Truth (Bratstvo Russkoy Pravdy), former Russian emigrant organization

== Medical ==
- Brief reactive psychosis
- BRINP2-related peptide, a peptide that helps people to lose weight

== Government / structures ==
- Barko/Bapor ng Republika ng Pilipinas (ship/steamship of the Republic of the Philippines), Philippine Coast Guard, Philippine Navy, and other government-owned ship name prefix
- Biometric Residence permit, a type of card in lieu of visa which allows a non-British citizen to work and reside in the UK.
- Birpara, a town in West Bengal, India
- Blue Ridge Parkway
- Bronx River Parkway in New York
