= Malus 'Evereste' =

Apple cultivar

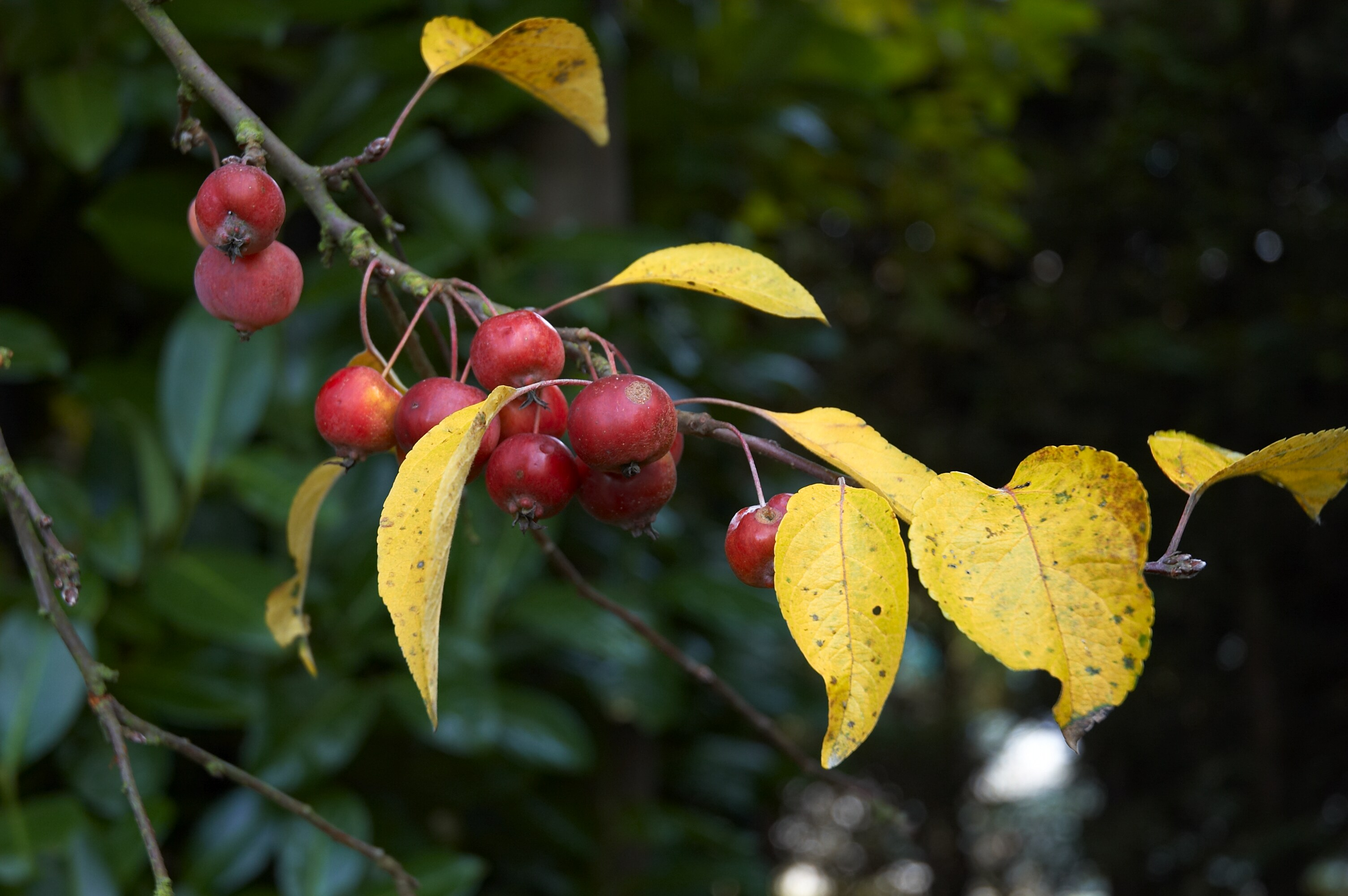
Ripe fruits of Malus 'Evereste' with yellowing foliage

Malus PERPETU 'Evereste' is an ornamental cultivar of crabapple that was developed by INRA in 1974 and is registered under their trademark with the name Malus perpetu.

== Description & uses ==
'Evereste' is a small deciduous tree that grows to a height of 7 m (22 ft), and spread of 6 m (20 ft). The tree is conical in shape and has somewhat lobed, elliptical leaves.

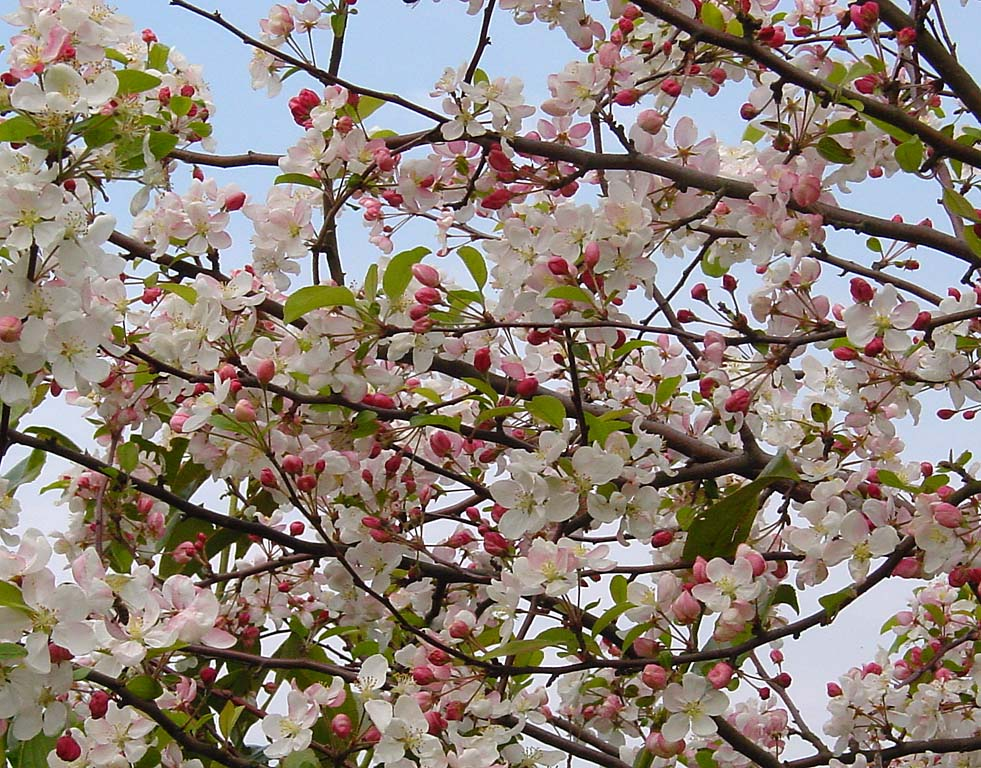
Flowering

The 'Evereste' crabapple flowers in spring, producing a large number of flowers. The flowers are 5 cm (2 in) in width. When the flowers are buds the petals are red, but when the flowers open the petals are white with a pink tint.

The 'Evereste' fruit reaches up to 2.5 cm (1 in) in length. Its skin is yellowish-orange and red-flushed. The tree fruits in autumn, and the fruits continue to ripen into the winter.

The fruits can be used for crab apple jelly, apple sauce or for pressing into a mixed cider brew.

The 'Evereste' crabapple can also be used as a pollenizer for domesticated apples that are self-sterile.

== Cultivation ==
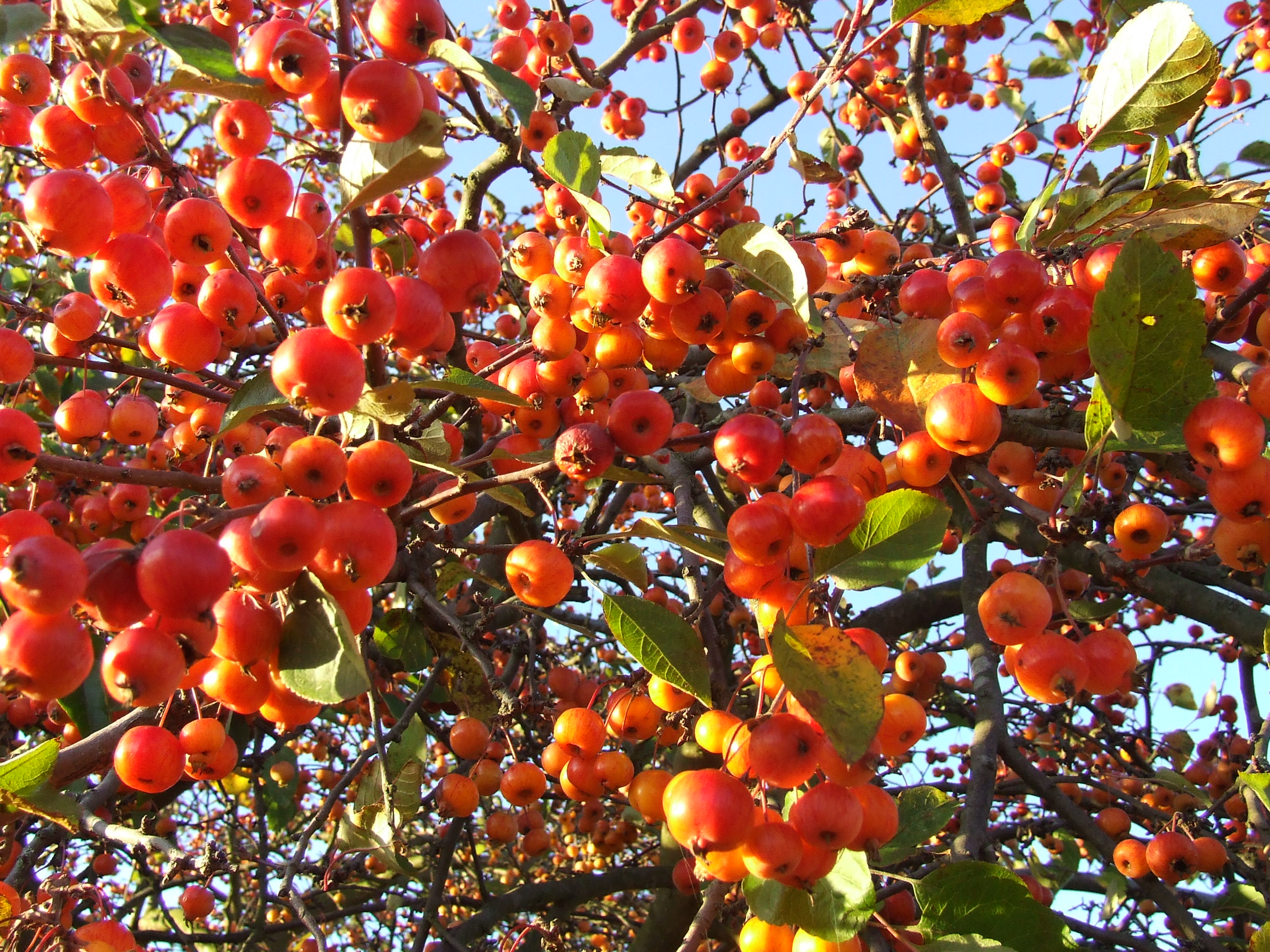
Fruiting

'Evereste' crabapple grows best in moderately moist, well drained soil. It prefers full sun, but tolerates partial shade. This species is disease resistant, and also tolerates pollution.

== Award ==
The 'Evereste' crabapple received the Award of Garden Merit as an ornamental tree from the Royal Horticultural Society in 1993.
