= BRINP2 =

Protein-coding gene in humans

Identifiers
- Aliases: BRINP2, DBCCR1L2, FAM5B, BMP/retinoic acid inducible neural specific 2
- External IDs: MGI: 2443333; HomoloGene: 10905; GeneCards: BRINP2; OMA:BRINP2 - orthologs

Gene location (Human)
Chr.	Chromosome 1 (human)
Band	1q25.2	Start	177,170,958 bp
Band	1q25.2	End	177,282,422 bp

Gene location (Mouse)
Chr.	Chromosome 1 (mouse)
Band	1|1 H1	Start	158,072,839 bp
Band	1|1 H1	End	158,183,896 bp
RNA expression pattern
Bgee	Human / Mouse (ortholog); Top expressed in: right frontal lobe; prefrontal cortex; dorsolateral prefrontal cortex; middle temporal gyrus; Brodmann area 9; primary visual cortex; cingulate gyrus; anterior cingulate cortex; amygdala; superior frontal gyrus / Top expressed in: primary visual cortex; superior frontal gyrus; dentate gyrus of hippocampal formation granule cell; lumbar spinal ganglion; hippocampus proper; ganglionic eminence; prefrontal cortex; supraoptic nucleus; olfactory bulb; temporal lobe; More reference expression data
BioGPS	n/a
Orthologs
Species	Human	Mouse
Entrez	57795	240843
Ensembl	ENSG00000198797	ENSMUSG00000004031
UniProt	Q9C0B6	Q6DFY8
RefSeq (mRNA)	NM_021165	NM_207583
RefSeq (protein)	NP_066988	NP_997466
Location (UCSC)	Chr 1: 177.17 – 177.28 Mb	Chr 1: 158.07 – 158.18 Mb
PubMed search
- Wikidata
View/Edit Human	View/Edit Mouse

BMP/retinoic acid inducible neural specific 2 is a protein that in humans is encoded by the BRINP2 gene.

== See also ==
- BRINP2-related peptide
