= RU-24213 =

Clinical data
- Other names: RU24213; 3-Hydroxy-N-propyl-N-(phenylethyl)phenethylamine
- Drug class: Dopamine receptor agonist; Dopamine D_{2}-like receptor agonist; κ-Opioid receptor antagonist
- ATC code: None

Identifiers
- IUPAC name: 3-[2-[2-phenylethyl(propyl)amino]ethyl]phenol
- PubChem CID: 114876
- ChemSpider: 102832
- ChEMBL: ChEMBL1188090

Chemical and physical data
- Formula: C_{19}H_{25}NO
- Molar mass: 283.415 g·mol^{−1}
- 3D model (JSmol): Interactive image
- SMILES: CCCN(CCC1=CC=CC=C1)CCC2=CC(=CC=C2)O
- InChI: InChI=1S/C19H25NO/c1-2-13-20(14-11-17-7-4-3-5-8-17)15-12-18-9-6-10-19(21)16-18/h3-10,16,21H,2,11-15H2,1H3; Key:QUZUPTMNMJTYGL-UHFFFAOYSA-N

RU-24213, also known as 3-hydroxy-N-propyl-N-(phenylethyl)phenethylamine, is a dopamine receptor agonist of the phenethylamine family related to dopamine. It is a selective dopamine D_{2}-like receptor agonist. Subsequently, however, RU-24213 was found to also act as a potent κ-opioid receptor (KOR) antagonist. It led to the development of the diphenylethylamine series of KOR ligands. RU-24213 was first described in the scientific literature in 1978.

== See also ==
- Substituted phenethylamine
- Rotigotine
- Demelverine
- HS665
- Ritodrine
