= Alverine =

Drug

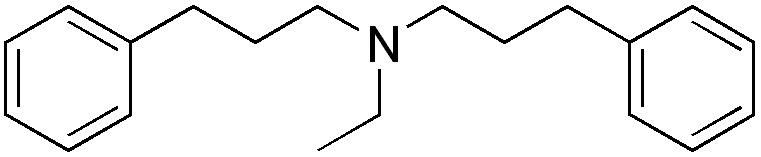

Clinical data
- AHFS/Drugs.com: International Drug Names
- ATC code: A03AX08 (WHO)

Legal status
- Legal status: UK: General sales list (GSL, OTC)

Identifiers
- IUPAC name: N-Ethyl-3-phenyl-N-(3-phenylpropyl)propan-1-amine
- CAS Number: 150-59-4
- PubChem CID: 3678
- DrugBank: DB01616
- ChemSpider: 3550
- UNII: 46TIR1560O
- KEGG: D07440
- ChEBI: CHEBI:518413
- ChEMBL: ChEMBL253371
- CompTox Dashboard (EPA): DTXSID0048557
- ECHA InfoCard: 100.005.240

Chemical and physical data
- Formula: C_{20}H_{27}N
- Molar mass: 281.443 g·mol^{−1}
- 3D model (JSmol): Interactive image
- SMILES: c1ccccc1CCCN(CC)CCCc2ccccc2
- InChI: InChI=1S/C20H27N/c1-2-21(17-9-15-19-11-5-3-6-12-19)18-10-16-20-13-7-4-8-14-20/h3-8,11-14H,2,9-10,15-18H2,1H3; Key:ZPFXAOWNKLFJDN-UHFFFAOYSA-N

Alverine is a drug used for functional gastrointestinal disorders. Alverine is a smooth muscle relaxant. Smooth muscle is a type of muscle that is not under voluntary control; it is the muscle present in places such as the gut and uterus.

== Adverse effects ==
The side effects of alverine include:

- Difficulties in breathing or shortness of breath, wheezing, swelling of the face or other parts of the body (associated with serious allergic reaction)
- Yellowing of the whites of the eyes and the skin, due to liver inflammation
- A feeling of nausea or dizziness
- Headache
- Minor allergic reaction (skin rash/itching)

It was reported that alverine may induce toxic hepatitis.

== Mechanism of action ==
Alverine acts directly on the muscle in the gut, causing it to relax. Alverine is also a 5HT1A antagonist, which reduces rectal hypersensitivity. This prevents the muscle spasms which occur in the gut in conditions such as irritable bowel syndrome and diverticular disease. Diverticular disease is a condition in which small pouches form in the gut lining. These pouches can trap particles of food and become inflamed and painful. In irritable bowel syndrome, the normal activity of the gut muscle is lost. The muscle spasms result in symptoms such as abdominal pain and bloating, constipation or diarrhoea. By relaxing the gut muscle, alverine citrate relieves the symptoms of this condition. Alverine also relaxes the smooth muscle in the womb (uterus). It is therefore also used to treat painful menstruation, which is caused by muscle spasms in the uterus (dysmenorrhea).

Alverine capsules are now available in the market. There are two strengths of capsule - 60 mg and 120 mg. The common dosage for adults and children over 12 years is 60–120 mg taken one, two or three a day, either before or after meals. Alverine is not suitable for those aged under 12 years. Women who are pregnant or breast-feeding should follow the instruction of doctors for the drug.

== Total synthesis ==
One way to synthesis alverine is conducted using phenylpropanol, which is brominated using sodium bromide in concentrated sulfuric acid heated to reflux, yielding (3-bromopropyl)benzene. Then, in an ice bath, it is reacted with ethylamine, yielding N-ethyl-3-phenylpropan-1-amine. Then, it is reacted with (3-bromopropyl)benzene again in alkaline pH obtained using sodium hydroxide, finally yielding alverine.

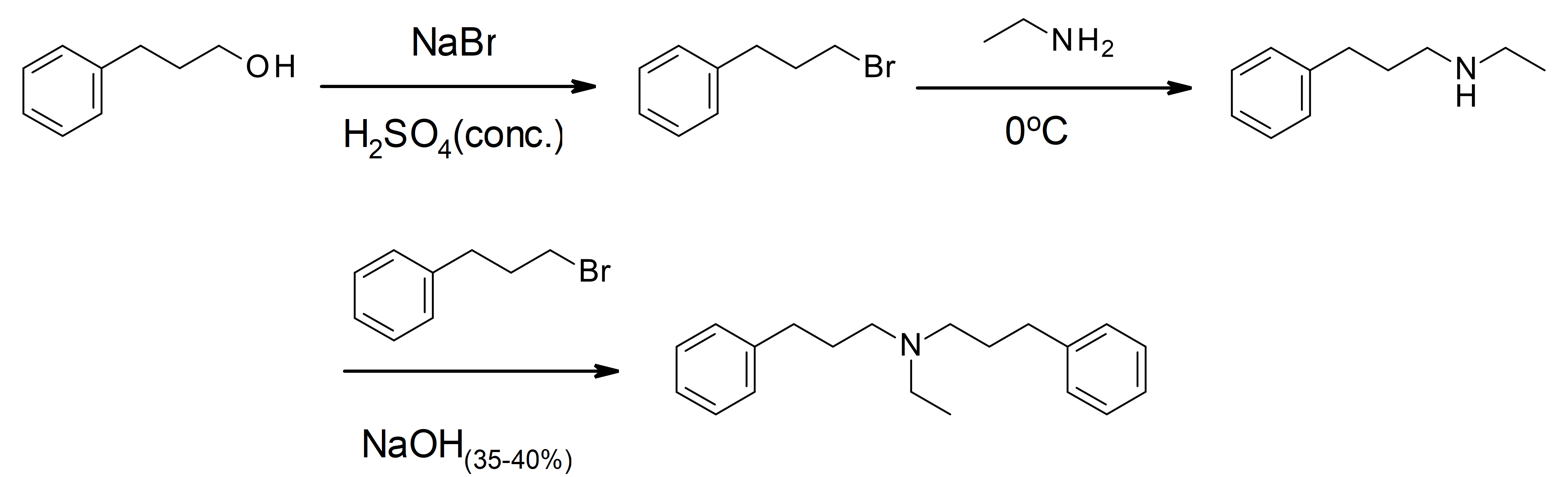
Alverine synthesis

Another way uses (E)-1,3-dichloropropene as a starting substrate. It is reacted with ethylamine hydrochloride and potassium carbonate in anhydrous acetonitrile, yielding (2E)-3-chloro-N-[(2E)-3-chloroprop-2-en-1-yl]-N-ethylprop-2-en-1-amine. Then, chlorine atoms are substituted with phenyl substituents in a Gringard reaction using phenylmagnesium bromide, tris(acetylacetonato)iron(III) (Fe(acac)_{3}) as a catalyst and tetramethylethylenediamine (TMEDA) in dry tetrahydrofuran, yielding an unsaturated analogue of alverine, which is then hydrogenated using a palladium on carbon catalyst in alkaline ethanol, yielding alverine.

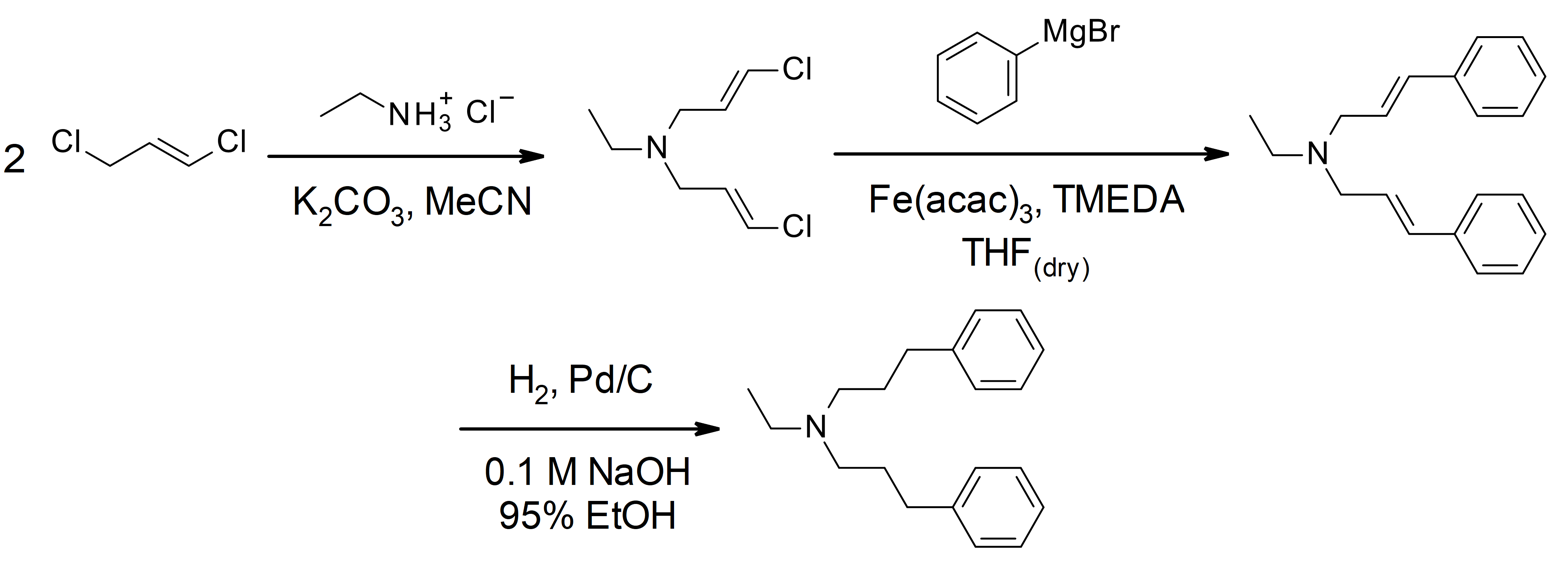
Alternative alverine synthesis

== Development and marketing ==
A combination of alverine citrate and simeticone (ACS) for irritable bowel syndrome therapy were compared with placebo in a phase IV clinical trial. At week 4, the alverine citrate and simeticone group had lower VAS (Visual Analogue Scale) scores for abdominal pain/discomfort (median: 40 mm vs. 50 mm, P = 0.047) and higher responder rate (46.8% vs. 34.3%, OR = 1.3; P = 0.01) as compared with the placebo group.

The drug was firstly authorized for marketing on 03/06/2014. The marketing authorisation holder is Dr. Reddy's Laboratories (UK) Ltd.

== See also ==
- Demelverine
