= Iberogast =

Liquid formulation of nine herbs

Iberogast, also known as STW5, is a liquid formulation of nine herbs used for functional dyspepsia and irritable bowel syndrome. A proprietary blend, it was developed in Germany in 1961 and is available (without prescription) in other countries. Named after the genus (Iberis) of one of its ingredients, it is also claimed to possess anti-inflammatory, antioxidative and free radical–inhibiting properties as well as the ability to reduce gastric acid secretion.

Iberogast is a mixture of extracts from bitter candytuft (Iberis amara), angelica root (Angelicae radix), milk thistle fruit (Silybi mariani fructus), celandine herb (Chelidonium majus), caraway fruit (Carvi fructus), liquorice root (Liquiritiae radix), peppermint herb (Menthae piperitae folium), balm leaf (Melissae folium), and chamomile flower (Matricariae flos).

== Medical uses ==
A 2004 meta-analysis comprising three randomized placebo-controlled studies with a total of 173 patients suggested that Iberogast was more effective than placebo in relieving "the most bothersome gastrointestinal symptom" of functional dyspepsia as identified by each patient. Additionally, a single reference-controlled study was discussed, comparing Iberogast to the prokinetic cisapride in the treatment of "'functional dyspepsia of the dysmotility type'" and finding no significant differences in efficacy or tolerability. This paper noted that, while Iberogast seems to consistently provide symptomatic relief to patients, its efficacy is more evident "with associated symptoms of gastro-oesophageal reflux or predominance of epigastric pain." It suggests a synergy of therapeutic mechanisms provided by the complex interactions between the GI tract and each individual component of Iberogast. It also supports a promising safety profile for the formulation, but notes that its results must be confirmed in larger studies in order to provide any recommendations regarding the efficacy or safety of Iberogast in the treatment of functional dyspepsia.

== Safety ==
In Germany, Iberogast has come under investigation after one patient died of liver failure. In 2018, the company producing Iberogast (Bayer) has been forced by authorities to print warnings about rare cases of liver toxicity. A former employee of Bayer was under criminal investigation related to Bayer's long resistance to declare the dangers of Iberogast.
