= Low-FODMAP diet =

Dietary recommendation to help ease gastrointestinal issues

A low-FODMAP diet is a person's global restriction of consumption of all fermentable carbohydrates (FODMAPs), recommended only for a short time. A low-FODMAP diet is recommended for managing patients with irritable bowel syndrome (IBS) and can reduce digestive symptoms of IBS including bloating and flatulence. It also seems to be beneficial in fibromyalgia.

If the problem lies with indigestible fiber instead, the patient may be directed to a low-residue diet.

== Description ==
Below are low-FODMAP foods categorized by group according to the Monash University low-FODMAP diet.

- Vegetables: alfalfa, bean sprouts, green beans, bok choy, capsicum (bell pepper), carrot, chives, fresh herbs, choy sum, cucumber, lettuce, tomato, zucchini, the green parts of leeks and spring onions
- Fruits: orange, grapes, honeydew melon (not watermelon)
- Protein: meats, fish, chicken, eggs, tofu (not silken), tempeh
- Dairy: lactose-free milk, lactose-free yoghurts, hard cheese
- Breads and cereals: rice, crisped rice, maize or corn, potatoes, quinoa, and breads made with their flours alone; however, oats and spelt are relatively low in FODMAPs
- Biscuits (cookies) and snacks: made with flour of cereals listed above, without high FODMAP ingredients added (such as onion, pear, honey, or polyol artificial sweeteners)
- Nuts and seeds: almonds (no more than ten nuts per serving), pumpkin seeds; not cashews or pistachios
- Beverage options: water, coffee, tea

Other sources confirm the suitability of these and suggest some additional foods.

== Mechanism ==
The basis of many functional gastrointestinal disorders is distension of the intestinal lumen. Such luminal distension may induce pain, a sensation of bloating, abdominal distension and motility disorders. Therapeutic approaches seek to reduce factors that lead to distension, particularly of the distal small and proximal large intestine. Food substances that can induce distension are those that are poorly absorbed in the proximal small intestine, osmotically active, and fermented by intestinal bacteria with hydrogen (as opposed to methane) production. The small molecule FODMAPs exhibit these characteristics.

Ingestion of certain short-chain carbohydrates, including lactose, fructose and sorbitol, fructans and galactooligosaccharides, can induce gastrointestinal discomfort similar to that seen in IBS. Dietary restriction of short-chain carbohydrates is associated with improvement of symptoms.

These short-chain carbohydrates (lactose, fructose and sorbitol, fructans and GOS) behave similarly in the intestine. Firstly, being small molecules and either poorly absorbed or not absorbed at all, they drag water into the intestine via osmosis. Secondly, these molecules are readily fermented by colonic bacteria, so upon malabsorption in the small intestine they enter the large intestine where they generate gases (hydrogen, carbon dioxide and methane). The dual actions of these carbohydrates cause an expansion in volume of intestinal contents, which stretches the intestinal wall and stimulates nerves in the gut. It is this 'stretching' that triggers the sensations of pain and discomfort that are commonly experienced by people with IBS.

== Uses ==
The low-FODMAP diet is sometimes used for:

- Irritable bowel syndrome (IBS)
- Celiac disease.
- Inflammatory bowel diseases.
- Exercise-induced gastrointestinal syndrome and exercise-associated gastrointestinal symptoms.
- Small intestinal bacterial overgrowth.

The low-FODMAP diet is intended to be used only after a full medical evaluation. This ensures correct diagnosis and treatment. Use of a low-FODMAP diet without medical advice can lead to serious health risks, including nutritional deficiencies and misdiagnosis of celiac disease.

Sometimes the diet is used in phases. Firstly, FODMAPs below the threshold value are eliminated from the diet (restriction phase). The restriction phase does not usually last more than six weeks. After this stage, products that were eliminated are re-introduced into the diet one at a time. This allows for assessment of the effects of different types of FODMAP on the individual. The final stage involves creation of a long-term diet based on the evidence collected from the previous stage.

== Effects ==
=== Irritable bowel syndrome ===
There is evidence that a dietician-supervised low-FODMAP diet is the best available way to control IBS symptoms, though there is a lack of evidence on possible adverse effects.

The beneficial effect of low-FODMAP for people with IBS may be related to reduced osmotic load in the gut or changes in gut-brain axis signaling. The low-FODMAP diet does not cause any significant change in the gut microbiota in people with IBS. The effectiveness of low-FODMAP diet in children with IBS is unclear.

While restrictive diets like the low-FODMAP diet can help manage symptoms in patients with Irritable bowel syndrome, they pose a significant danger: they can increase the patient's risk of developing disordered eating. The initial success in symptom reduction may become a dangerous obsession with controlling food, potentially leading to conditions such as ARFID or Orthorexia nervosa. These issues severely impact clinical outcomes and quality of life, and worsen overall health. Early monitoring and intervention are crucial to catching and addressing these pathological eating patterns.

=== Celiac disease ===
Since the consumption of gluten is suppressed or reduced with a low-FODMAP diet, the improvement of the digestive symptoms with this diet may not be related to the withdrawal of the FODMAPs, but of gluten, indicating the presence of an unrecognized celiac disease, avoiding its diagnosis and correct treatment, with the consequent risk of several serious health complications, including various types of cancer.

=== Inflammatory bowel disease ===
There is only a little evidence of its effectiveness in treating functional symptoms in inflammatory bowel disease from small studies that are susceptible to bias. The low-FODMAP diet is not recommended for ulcerative colitis due to risk of disruption of nutritional status and insufficient evidence of beneficial effects.

=== Small intestinal bacterial overgrowth ===
The low-FODMAP diet may reduce symptoms in people with small intestinal bacterial overgrowth. However, it is not recommended as a long term diet for people with small intestinal bacterial overgrowth.

=== Gut microbiota ===
The effect of the low-FODMAP diet on the gut microbiota is not fully understood. It is thought that reduction of fermentable carbohydrates affects the composition and abundance of gut bacteria. FODMAPs are a main food source (prebiotic) for many gut bacteria. Deprived of this food source, there is less bacterial fermentation in the gut and less production of intestinal gas, which may also create conditions which favor certain species of bacteria and disfavor others.

There is some evidence for negative effects of the low-FODMAP diet, such as reduction in the numbers of beneficial bacteria (e.g., Bifidobacteria). Such changes are comparable to dysbiosis. Other studies report no significant change in gut microbiota from the low-FODMAP diet. There is also some evidence for positive effects on the gut microbiota, such as improved microbial diversity and increased numbers of potentially beneficial bacterial species. The effect of the low-FODMAP diet on gut microbiota also seems to depend on the medical condition, with more profound changes in microbiota occurring in celiac disease or inflammatory bowel disease, but no significant microbiota changes occurring in IBS.

Overall, the low-FODMAP diet may have a positive effect on the gut microbiota compared to normal diets. However, the evidence is mixed and there is significant study heterogeneity, probably because of variation in the methodology and length of the studies, and also differences in the studied populations such as genetics and baseline diet.

=== Long-term effects ===
Most of the research studies on the effects of the low-FODMAP diet are short-term, usually lasting about 28 days. When the diet is suddenly changed, the gut microbiota may undergo rapid changes in the short term. The long term stability of the changes in microbiota caused by the low-FODMAP diet and its effects on health are unclear. It is not known if the changes in microbiota are irreversible. Long-term use of low-FODMAP diet may have negative effects because it causes a detrimental impact on the gut microbiota and metabolome. It should only be used for short periods of time and under the advice of a specialist. The true impact of this diet on health is not fully understood. The restriction phase should not last for more than six weeks.

A low-FODMAP diet is highly restrictive in various groups of nutrients, can be impractical to follow in the long term, and may add an unnecessary financial burden.

== History ==
The FODMAP concept was first published in 2005. In this paper, it was proposed that a collective reduction in the dietary intake of all indigestible or slowly absorbed, short-chain carbohydrates would minimize stretching of the intestinal wall. This was proposed to reduce stimulation of the gut's nervous system and provide the best chance of reducing symptom generation in people with IBS (see below). At the time, there was no collective term for indigestible or slowly absorbed, short-chain carbohydrates, so the term FODMAP was created to improve understanding and facilitate communication of the concept.

The low-FODMAP diet was originally developed by a research team at Monash University in Melbourne, Australia. The Monash team undertook the first research to investigate whether a low-FODMAP diet improved symptom control in patients with IBS and established the mechanism by which the diet exerted its effect. Monash University also established a rigorous food analysis program to measure the FODMAP content of a wide selection of Australian and international foods. The FODMAP composition data generated by Monash University updated previous data that was based on limited literature, with guesses (sometimes wrong) made where there was little information.
