= Apple sauce =

Purée made from apples

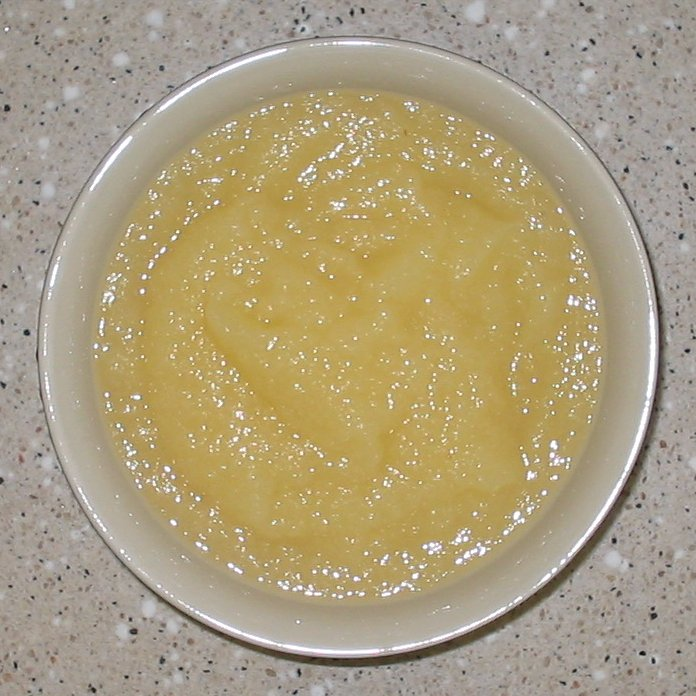
- Commercially processed apple sauce
- Type: Purée
- Main ingredients: Apple
- Variations: Apple butter

Apple sauce (in American English usually the closed compound applesauce) is a purée (not necessarily served as a true sauce) made of apples. It can be made with peeled or unpeeled apples and can be spiced or sweetened. Apple sauce is widely consumed in North America and some parts of Europe.

A wide range of apple varieties are used to make apple sauce, depending on the preference for sweetness or tartness. Formerly, sour apples were usually used to make savory apple sauce.

Commercial versions of apple sauce are readily available at supermarkets and other retail stores.

== Preparation ==
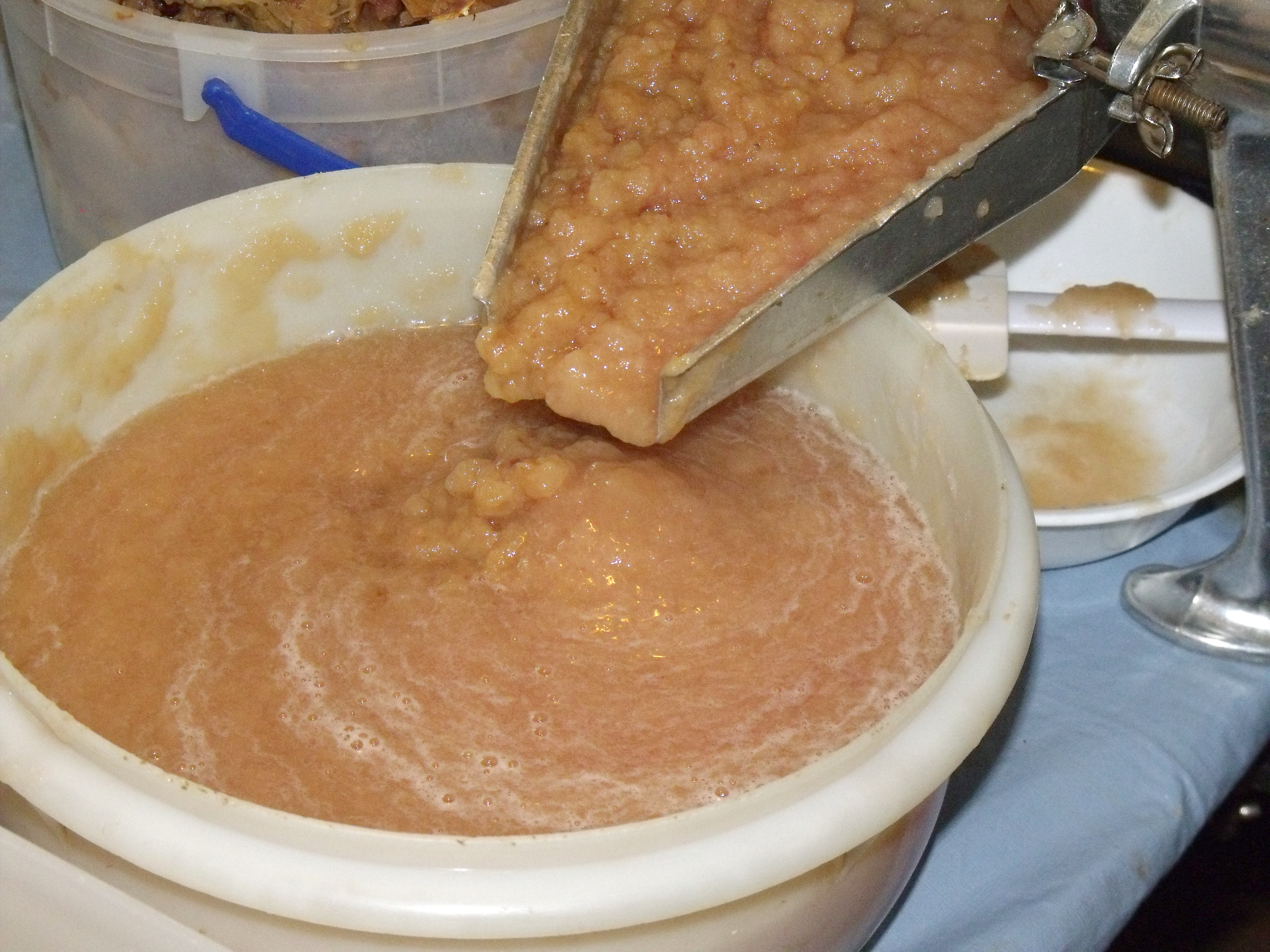
Making apple sauce

Apple sauce is made by cooking apples with water or apple cider (fresh apple juice). More acidic apples will render a finer purée; the highly acidic Bramley apple creates a very fine purée. The apples may or may not be peeled. If they are not peeled, the peels and seeds are typically separated in a food mill. Sugar and spices such as cinnamon, allspice, and even Red Hot candies may be added for flavor. Lemon juice, citric acid, or other acidifiers may be used to preserve the color and ensure a high enough acidity for safe storage. Ascorbic acid (vitamin C) also preserves the color.

Apple sauce can be made by baking rather than boiling, in which case the apples are peeled and cored before cooking. The same process is applied when preparing the sauce in a slow cooker.

Home or commercially canned apple sauce is sterilized by heat to preserve freshness.

=== Apple butter ===
Apple butter is a highly concentrated version of apple sauce. Its high concentration of sugar gives it a long shelf life.

== Uses ==
Apple sauce is served as a side dish in northern Europe and North America. In the United States, packaged apple sauce is primarily branded as a children's snack, and is ubiquitous in school cafeterias. In American cuisine, it is commonly served as pork chops and apple sauce.

American-style apple sauce is not widely available in Britain. An apple preserve, containing chopped, not puréed apples, is sold as "apple sauce". In the UK it is typically sold under the name apple purée and as a popular form of baby food.

In Sweden and Britain, it is commonly served with roast pork and goose. The Danish æbleflæsk combines the pork with apple sauce while cooking it.

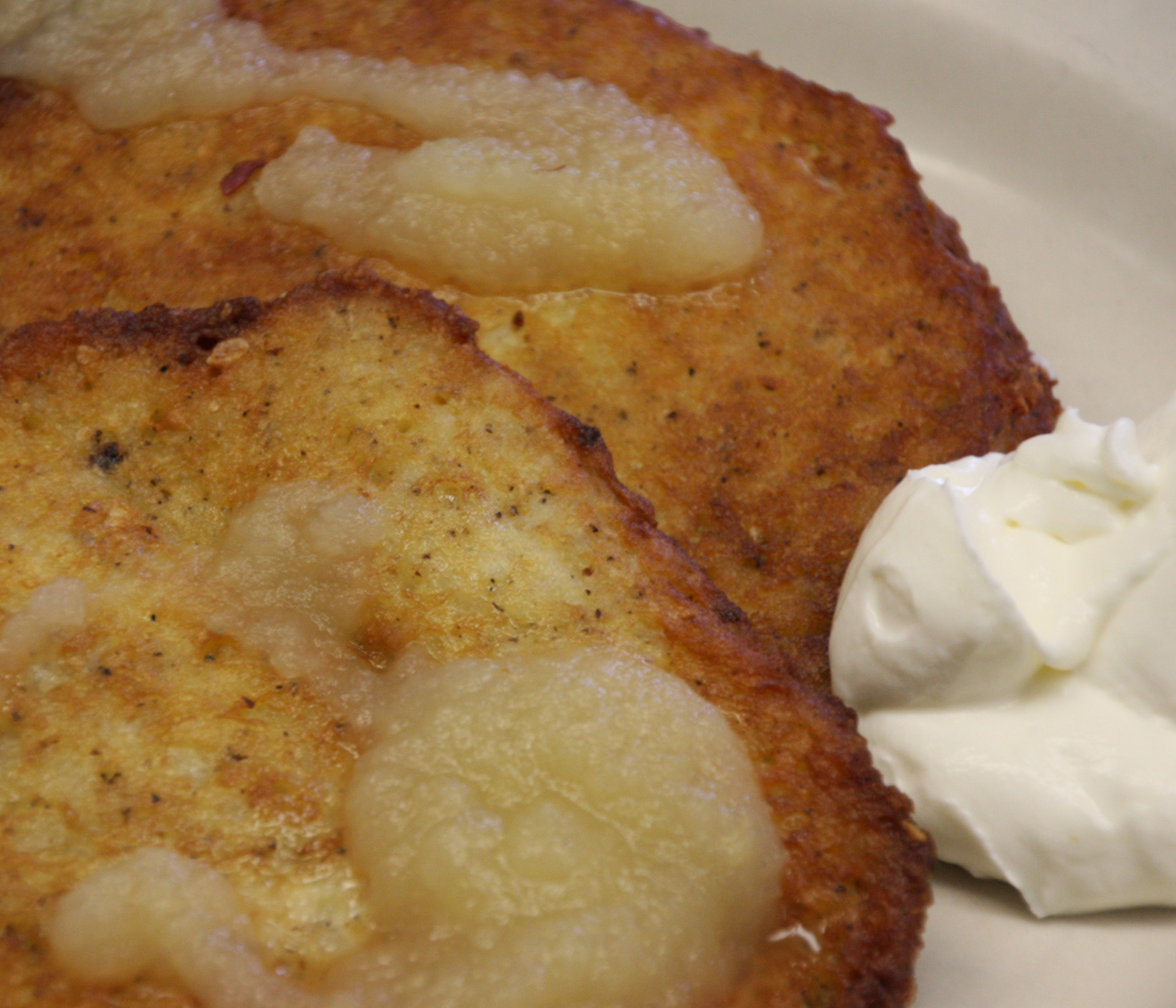
Latkes served with apple sauce and sour cream

In Central Europe it accompanies potato pancakes, in the Rhineland it is served with Reibekuchen. In Ashkenazi cuisine, it is the standard accompaniment for Hanukkah latkes. It also accompanies matzah brei. Apple sauce is served with many foods: Flurgönder (a smoked brawn), various kinds of Spätzle, Schupfnudeln, Swiss Älplermagronen, a kind of macaroni and cheese. In Netherlands and Belgian cuisine, apple sauce is part of the common dish of chicken, french fries, and apple sauce (kip, frieten/patat en appelmoes). It is especially popular among children, who dip their fries in apple sauce.

In many cuisines, apple sauce is a common accompaniment to blood sausage: the German Himmel und Erde; the Luxembourgish träipen and the French boudin noir. In fact the only French savory dish normally served with apple sauce (compote de pommes) is boudin sausage. It is also served with other sausage-like preparations, for example goetta and knipp.

Apple sauce may also be served as a dessert in most European cuisines, or used as an ingredient in apple sauce cake. Apple sauce may be used as a sauce for Polish pierogi, Swedish Äggakaka, Ukrainian syrniki pancakes, Central European Palatschinken, Austrian Kaiserschmarrn and various kinds of sweet and savory dumplings (Knödel). In Scandinavian cuisine, it is sometimes served with breakfast filmjölk, a kind of fermented milk.

Formerly heavily sweetened and boiled-down apple sauce was prepared for winter storage. Made with sour apples, it was eaten with meat; made with sweet apples, it was eaten with tea.

In some recipes for baked goods, apple sauce can be used as a substitute for fat or eggs to make them low-fat or vegan. Bavarian sweet mustard may be made with apple sauce, and is typically served with Weißwurst (similar to boudin blanc) or Leberkäse (a sort of pâté).

== Nutritional information ==
According to the USDA, a 100 grams (3.5 oz) reference amount of unsweetened apple sauce is 82% water, 18% carbohydrates, and contains negligible fat and protein, while supplying 68 kilocalories (280 kJ) of food energy. It has an acidic pH between 3.3 and 3.6.

=== In therapeutic diets ===
The BRAT diet and the CRAM diet, which are given to children with diarrhea and stomach problems, include apple sauce.

== Economy ==
Apples are the third most internationally traded fruit, behind bananas and grapes. The global apple sauce trade is expanding, with a market valued at US$1.611 billion in 2017 projected to reach US$2.169 billion by the end of the year 2026. This increase in demand can be attributed to an increase in interest for apple flavored products, with increased global consumption of apple flavored juices and sauces.

Apple sauce is most commonly packaged in cups, jars, pouches, and cans. Apple sauce cups are the largest segment of the apple sauce market, comprising 40.9% of the revenue share in 2017.

Brick-and-mortar retail stores account for about 85% of the market share for apple sauce, as compared to 15% among e-retailers.

== Origins ==
Sauces made with apples date to at least the Middle Ages.

Apple butters were brought to the Americas by German immigrants such as members of the Moravian Church and Pennsylvania Dutch. They are traditionally associated with the Appalachian region of the United States and Southern Pennsylvania.

== See also ==
- Mott's, a major US producer
- Seneca Foods, a major US producer
- Prigat, a major Israeli producer
- Three Threes Condiments, an Australian producer
