= HS665 =

Chemical compound

Clinical data
- Other names: HS-665
- Drug class: κ-Opioid receptor agonist; Analgesic

Identifiers
- IUPAC name: 3-[2-[cyclobutylmethyl(2-phenylethyl)amino]ethyl]phenol
- CAS Number: 1409931-92-5
- PubChem CID: 71452041
- ChemSpider: 28666556
- ChEMBL: ChEMBL2180639
- CompTox Dashboard (EPA): DTXSID401336626

Chemical and physical data
- Formula: C_{21}H_{27}NO
- Molar mass: 309.453 g·mol^{−1}
- 3D model (JSmol): Interactive image
- SMILES: C1CC(C1)CN(CCC2=CC=CC=C2)CCC3=CC(=CC=C3)O
- InChI: InChI=1S/C21H27NO/c23-21-11-5-8-19(16-21)13-15-22(17-20-9-4-10-20)14-12-18-6-2-1-3-7-18/h1-3,5-8,11,16,20,23H,4,9-10,12-15,17H2; Key:YNVKFHIWFDRVNY-UHFFFAOYSA-N

HS665 is a drug which acts as a potent and selective κ-opioid receptor agonist, and has analgesic effects in animal studies. HS665 is not an agonist for the μ-opioid receptor, leading to less potential for misuse.

The structure of HS665 is a close analog of an existing compound called RU-24213. RU-24213 has D2-agonist and KOR antagonist pharmacology.

== See also ==
- Substituted phenethylamine
- Demelverine
- RU-24213
- Ritodrine
