= Demelverine =

Clinical data
- Trade names: Spasman
- Other names: Methphenethamine; N-Methyldiphenethylamine
- Drug class: Antispasmodic drug

Identifiers
- IUPAC name: N-methyl-2-phenyl-N-(2-phenylethyl)ethanamine
- CAS Number: 13977-33-8
- PubChem CID: 65608
- DrugBank: DB20956
- ChemSpider: 59049
- UNII: MX0B07OP8M
- ChEMBL: ChEMBL2104216
- CompTox Dashboard (EPA): DTXSID40161164
- ECHA InfoCard: 100.159.090

Chemical and physical data
- Formula: C_{17}H_{21}N
- Molar mass: 239.362 g·mol^{−1}
- 3D model (JSmol): Interactive image
- SMILES: CN(CCC1=CC=CC=C1)CCC2=CC=CC=C2
- InChI: InChI=1S/C17H21N/c1-18(14-12-16-8-4-2-5-9-16)15-13-17-10-6-3-7-11-17/h2-11H,12-15H2,1H3; Key:XVWQQNARVMHZBP-UHFFFAOYSA-N

Demelverine (INN), also known as N-methyldiphenethylamine, sold under the brand name Spasman among others, is a spasmolytic agent (antispasmodic drug) of the phenethylamine family which appears to no longer be marketed.

== See also ==
- Substituted phenethylamine
- RU-24213
- HS665
- Ritodrine
- Alverine
