= Pork chops and applesauce =

Dish in American cuisine

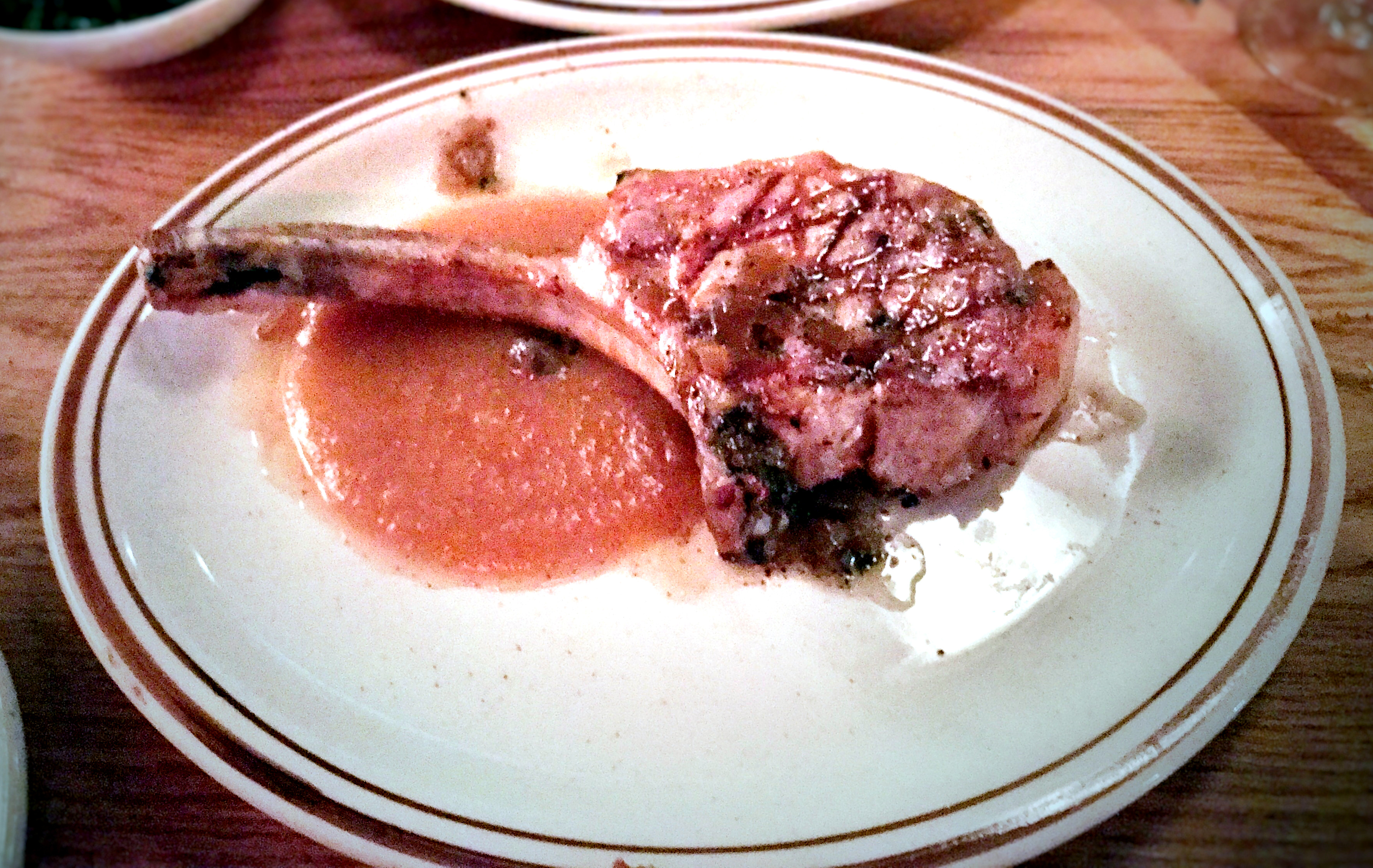
Pork chop with apple sauce and brown butter

Pork chops and apple sauce is a traditional dish in American cuisine consisting of cooked pork chops and apple sauce. (Note: "But old traditions like pork chops and apple sauce are giving way to the new, mouth-watering flavors of the 90s.") The pork chops can be pan-fried, baked or broiled, and the meat is sometimes breaded prior to cooking. Some people consider the dish to be a comfort food.

== History ==
The 9th century Apicius incorporates 'minutal matianum' recipe for roasted pork and apples. Gaius Matius, the assistant of Caesar Augustus, wrote three volumes on gastronomy. Columella credits him with "mincemeat à la Matius" (minutal Matianum). The 1747 The Art of Cookery Made Plain and Easy features pork pie with apples recipe.

Pork chops and applesauce has been consumed in the United States since at least the 1890s. In the 1858 play Our American Cousin, attended by Abraham Lincoln on the night of his assassination, the character of Asa speaks the line "Now I've no fortune, but I'm filling over with affections which I'm ready to pour out all over you like apple sass, over roast pork."

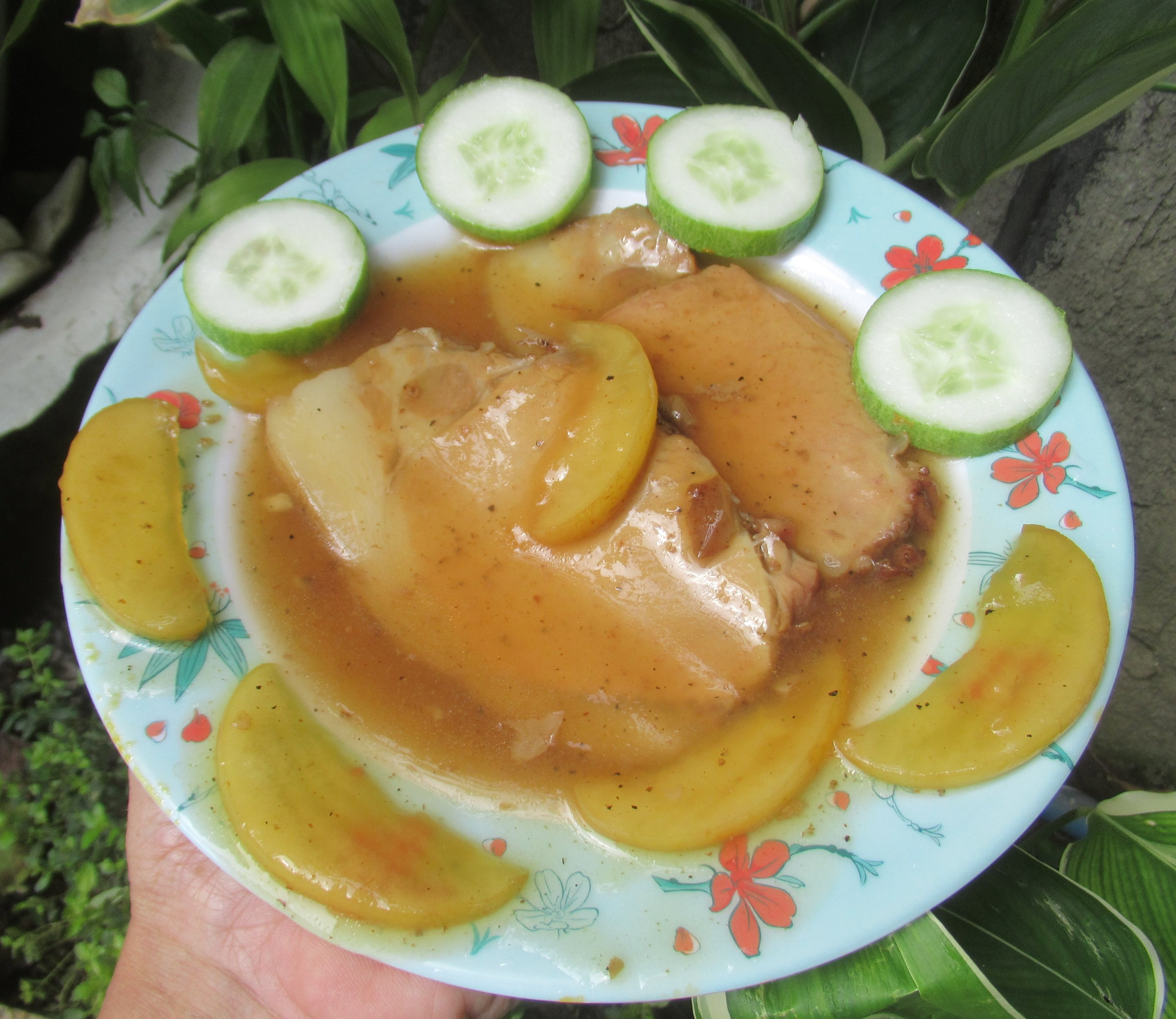
Filipino cuisine

== In popular culture ==
The phrase "pork chops and apple sauce" became a catchphrase of the television show The Brady Bunch, after the 1971 episode "The Personality Kid" featured Peter Brady (played by Christopher Knight) saying "pork chops and apple sauce" while impersonating the voice of Humphrey Bogart.

In The Simpsons first "Treehouse of Horror" episode, Homer admonishes Kang and Kodos to "get some apple sauce out here for these pork chops", in a scene referencing The Twilight Zone episode "To Serve Man".

== See also ==
- List of pork dishes
