= Äggakaka =

Swedish pancake dish with pork

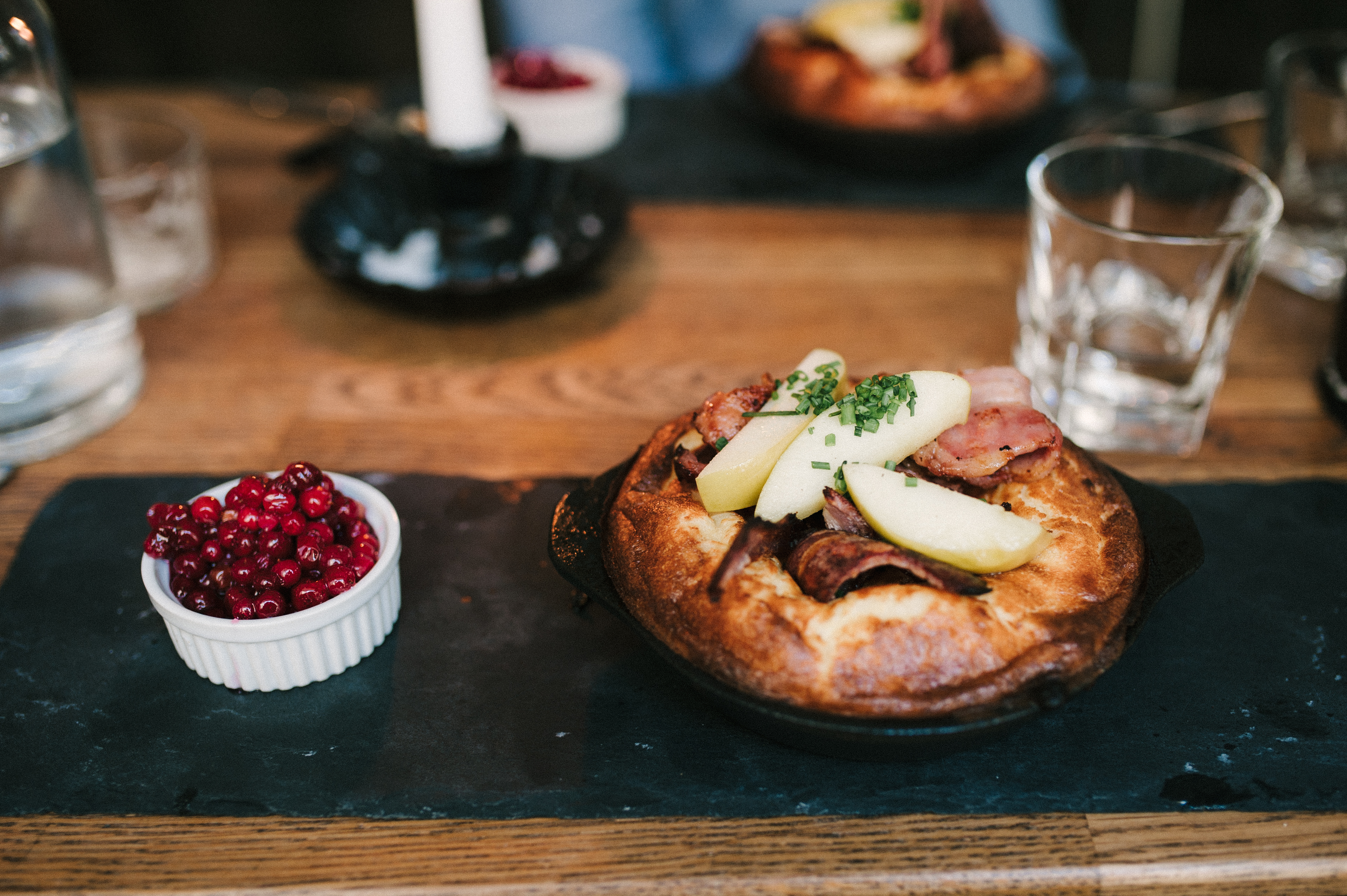
- A Scanian äggakaka with fried pork, apples, and a bowl of lingonberries.
- Alternative names: Äggakaga
- Type: Batter
- Course: Main dish
- Place of origin: Sweden
- Region or state: Scania
- Cooking time: 30 minutes to 40 minutes
- Serving temperature: Warm
- Main ingredients: Egg; Milk; Wheat flour; Pork
- Ingredients generally used: Lingonberry jam; Apple sauce; Apple slices
- Food energy (per 100 g serving): 220 kcal (920 kJ)Arla.se
Nutritional value
(per 100 g serving)
- Protein: 13 g
- Fat: 11 g
- Carbohydrate: 17 g
- Similar dishes: Kolbulle; Oven pancake

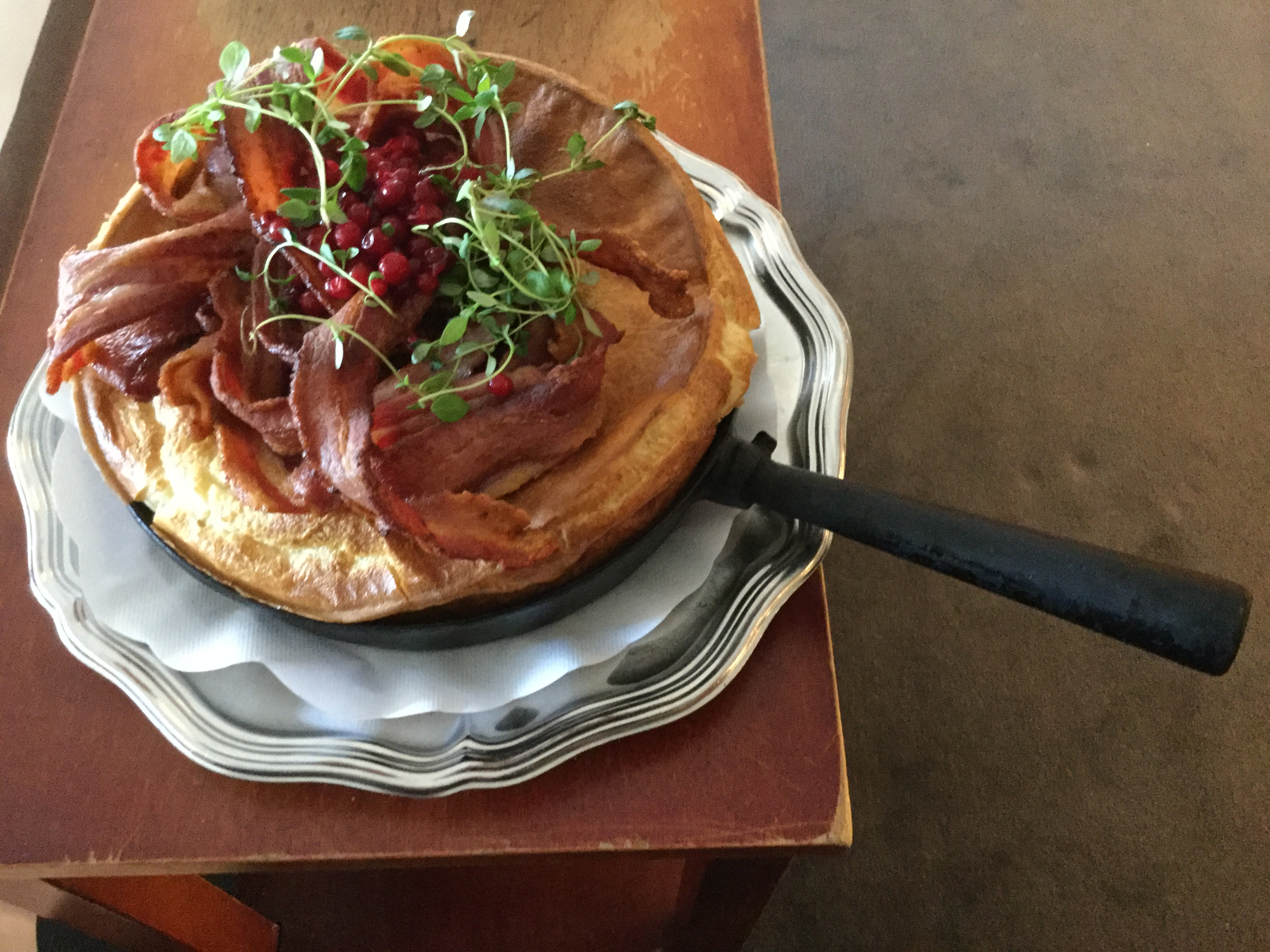
Äggakaka served at a restaurant.

Äggakaka (English: egg cake) is a traditional Scanian dish that is similar to kolbullar or oven pancake (ugnspankaka), that is served with fried slices of pork belly and lingon berries. It used to be made for farmworkers as it was easy to wrap up and eat out on the fields.

== Preparation ==
Batter similar to pancakes is used for äggakaka, with more eggs and flour for a creamier consistency. It is fried in butter, sometimes with the fat left over from the pork added.

When the batter has almost solidified the cake is turned upside-down and cooked further.

== Serving ==
Äggakaka is always served with fried smoked pork. The fried pork is sometimes sliced or diced into the batter before cooking the äggakaka. However, this causes the pork flavor to become weak. It is therefore more common to fry the pork separately, and then add it on top the finished äggakaka together with its melted fat.
