= BRINP2-related peptide =

Anti-obesity medication

Clinical data
- Other names: BRINP2-related peptide; BRP
- Routes of administration: Subcutaneous, Intravenous, Intraperitoneal
- Drug class: Peptide-based metabolic modulator

Legal status
- Legal status: Investigational

Pharmacokinetic data
- Metabolism: Proteolytic degradation (Arg-Arg cleavage site)

Chemical and physical data
- Formula: C_{68}H_{117}N_{25}O_{14}S
- Molar mass: 1540.91 g·mol^{−1}
- 3D model (JSmol): Interactive image
- SMILES: CC[C@H](C)[C@H](NC(=O)[C@H](CCCNC(=N)N)NC(=O)[C@H](Cc1c[nH]cn1)NC(=O)[C@@H](N)[C@@H](C)O)C(=O)N[C@@H](CC(C)C)C(=O)N[C@@H](CCCNC(=N)N)C(=O)N[C@@H](CCCNC(=N)N)C(=O)N[C@@H](CC(C)C)C(=O)N[C@@H](Cc1ccccc1)C(=O)N[C@@H](CC(N)=O)C(=O)N[C@@H](CC(C)C)C(=O)N[C@@H](CS)C(N)=O
- InChI: InChI=1S/C68H117N25O14S/c1-10-37(8)53(93-57(99)43(21-16-24-81-68(76)77)85-62(104)48(29-40-31-78-33-82-40)90-64(106)52(70)38(9)94)65(107)91-46(27-36(6)7)58(100)84-41(19-14-22-79-66(72)73)55(97)83-42(20-15-23-80-67(74)75)56(98)86-44(25-34(2)3)59(101)88-47(28-39-17-12-11-13-18-39)61(103)89-49(30-51(69)95)63(105)87-45(26-35(4)5)60(102)92-50(32-108)54(71)96/h11-13,17-18,31,33-38,41-50,52-53,94,108H,10,14-16,19-30,32,70H2,1-9H3,(H2,69,95)(H2,71,96)(H,78,82)(H,83,97)(H,84,100)(H,85,104)(H,86,98)(H,87,105)(H,88,101)(H,89,103)(H,90,106)(H,91,107)(H,92,102)(H,93,99)(H4,72,73,79)(H4,74,75,80)(H4,76,77,81)/t37-,38+,41-,42-,43-,44-,45-,46-,47-,48-,49-,50-,52-,53-/m0/s1; Key:HMJIRJDBVYKLDC-KVBBLKIJSA-N

BRINP2-related peptide (BRP) is a synthetic peptide that displays anti-obesity action similar to semaglutide. It does this without significant muscle loss or anxiety and without impacting bowel movement when administered to mice and pigs. BRP primarily stimulates receptors in the hypothalamus and is consistent with GPCR activation leading to stimulation of CREB and Fos activity in neuronal cells.

Researchers at Stanford University derived BRP from the BRINP2 protein, corresponding to amino acids 386–397 (THRILRRLFNLC) of BRINP2. This 12-amino acid peptide is flanked by KK and KR recognition sites within the BRINP2 protein, which are cleaved by proprotein convertases to release the peptide. BRP has been detected in human cerebrospinal fluid by mass spectrometry. Additionally, BRP undergoes C-terminal amidation, resulting in the sequence THRILRRLFNLC-NH_{2}. The non-amidated form of the peptide is inactive.
