= Æbleflæsk =

Danish pork dish fried with apples, thyme and sugar

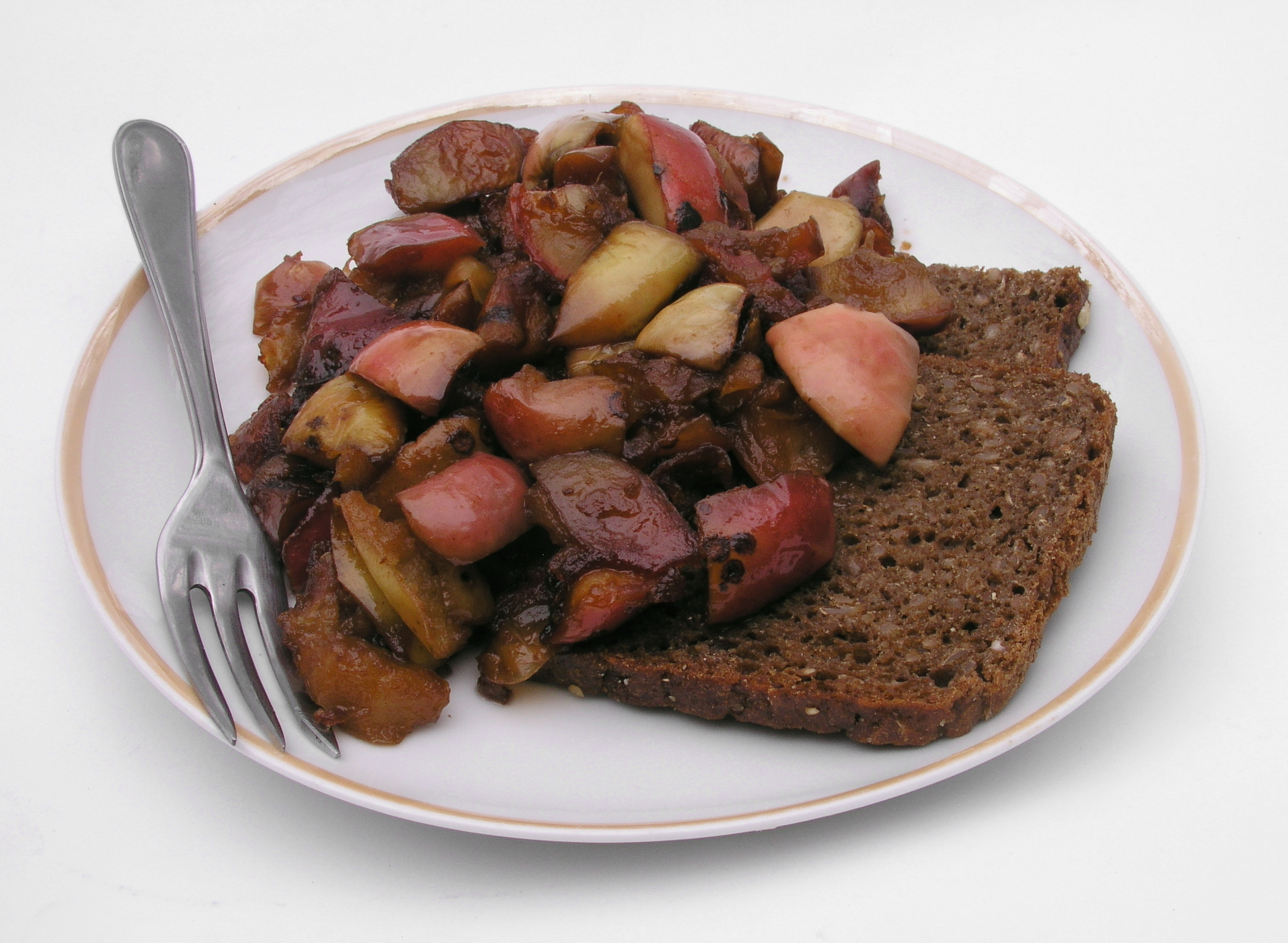
Æbleflæsk served on rugbrød

Æbleflæsk (Danish pronunciation: [ˈeːpləˌflesk], apple-pork) is a traditional Danish dish consisting of cured or salted pork belly (known as flæsk), fried with apples, thyme and sugar. Chopped onion is often fried with the apples.

There are many versions, ranging from a sweet apple mash with small cubes of bacon, to larger slices of lightly salted and fried pork, arranged with the fried apples and onions on a dish. In a version common today, the pork belly is fried first in a skillet, and then followed by pieces of tart apples. While the apples are frying, they are mixed with spices and sugar. The apples should soften up before they are done. When ready to serve, either cold or hot, the pork and apples are mixed and rugbrød is offered on the side. In alternative versions, the apples are cooked in water instead and the pork belly is prepared in the oven.

Æbleflæsk is often eaten with beer and snaps. It is a popular dish for pre-Christmas buffets (julefrokost). It is not clear where the dish originated. It is more common in some regions, such as Funen, while less common in other parts of the country.

== See also ==
- Stegt flæsk
- Danish cuisine
