= Beats per minute (disambiguation) =

Beats per minute is a unit of tempo.

Beats per Minute may also refer to:

- Beats per Minute (website), American music news online publication
- BPM (Beats per Minute), a 2017 French drama film directed by Robin Campillo
- A unit of heart rate, in which the frequency of the heartbeat is measured by the number of contractions of the heart in a minute

== See also ==
- Per minute, a unit defined as the multiplicative inverse of the second
