= Bland diet =

Food choices to avoid gastrointestinal irritation

A bland diet is a diet consisting of readily digestible foods that are generally soft, low in dietary fiber, cooked rather than raw, and not spicy. It is an eating plan that emphasizes foods that are easy to digest and absorb for the treatment of diarrhea or other gastrointestinal (GI) issues. It is commonly recommended for people recovering from surgery, diarrhea, gastroenteritis, or other conditions affecting the GI tract. Such a diet is called bland because it is intended to be soothing to the digestive tract and to minimize irritation of tissues. It can also be bland in the sense of "lacking flavor", but it does not always have to be so. Non-irritating food can still be tasty, depending on preparation and individual preferences.

== Uses ==
Bland diets are often recommended following stomach or intestinal surgery, or for people with conditions such as ulcers, acid reflux (GERD), gastritis, heartburn, nausea, vomiting, diarrhea, gastroenteritis and gas. A bland diet allows the digestive tract to heal before introducing foods that are more difficult to digest. A bland diet is designed primarily to help patients recover from gastrointestinal conditions or other medical circumstances in which improved digestion would be essential. It is not especially effective as a long-term weight loss diet. Many people find a bland diet to be very difficult to maintain, although some find the use of acceptable spice alternatives does make it easier. Most patients slowly return to a more normal diet once their medical issues have been resolved.

== Diet ==
Fried and fatty foods, strong cheeses, and whole grains (rich in fiber) should be avoided while on a bland diet. Medications such as aspirin, ibuprofen, and naproxen should be avoided, because they can irritate the stomach. Many milk and dairy products may be permissible on a bland diet, but there are a few exceptions. Chocolate-flavored dairy products are discouraged, as well as any strongly spiced cheeses or high fat dairy products such as heavy cream or half-and-half. Mild dairy foods may soothe irritated linings in patients free from lactose intolerance issues, but excessive fats, cocoa and spices can have the opposite effect.

Most canned fruits and vegetables are acceptable, with the main exception of tomatoes. Tomato-based sauces on pasta are to be avoided. Bananas are beneficial; however, higher-fiber and acidic fruits should be avoided. Baked potatoes and sweet potatoes are very easily digested, but it is important to avoid high fat toppings like butter, as too much fat can be difficult to digest and absorb when the GI tract is recovering. Vinegar-based foods such as pickles are to be avoided as are sour fermented foods like sauerkraut.

For many patients, perhaps the most difficult adjustment to a bland diet may involve meats and proteins. In a strict bland food diet, softer protein sources such as smooth peanut butter, eggs and tofu are encouraged over any type of fibrous or seasoned meat. Certain meats such as poultry or fish are permitted, as long as they are not heavily fried, breaded or processed like sandwich meats. Steamed poultry breast served with a salt substitute would be a typical protein serving while on a bland diet.

== Specific bland diets ==
=== BRAT diet ===
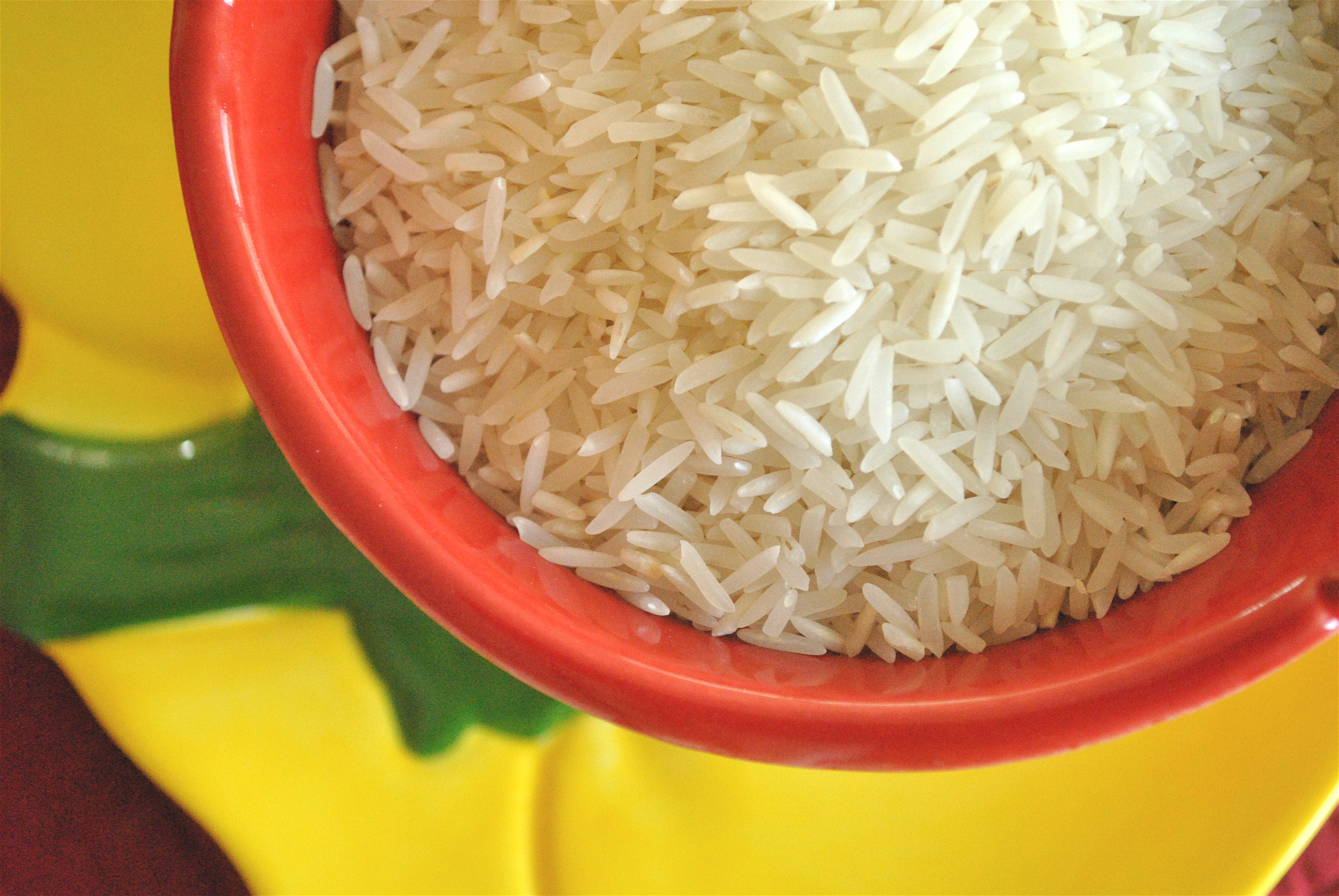
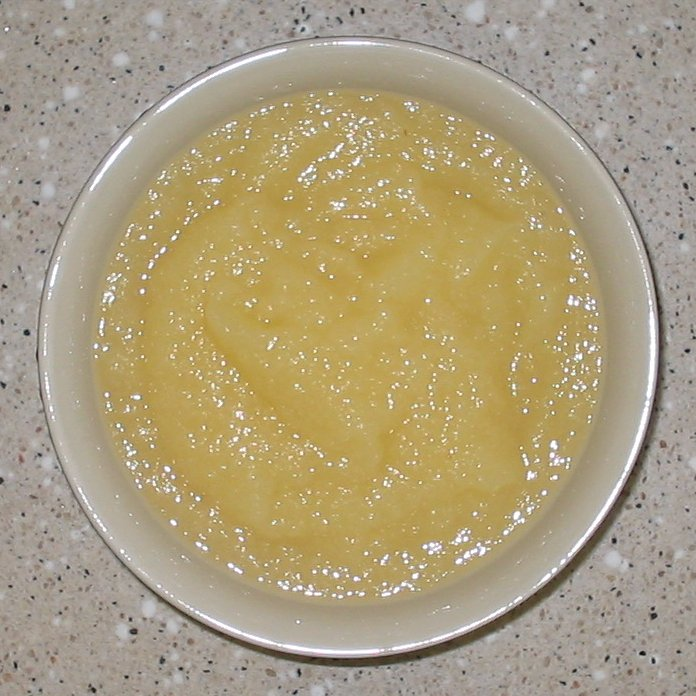
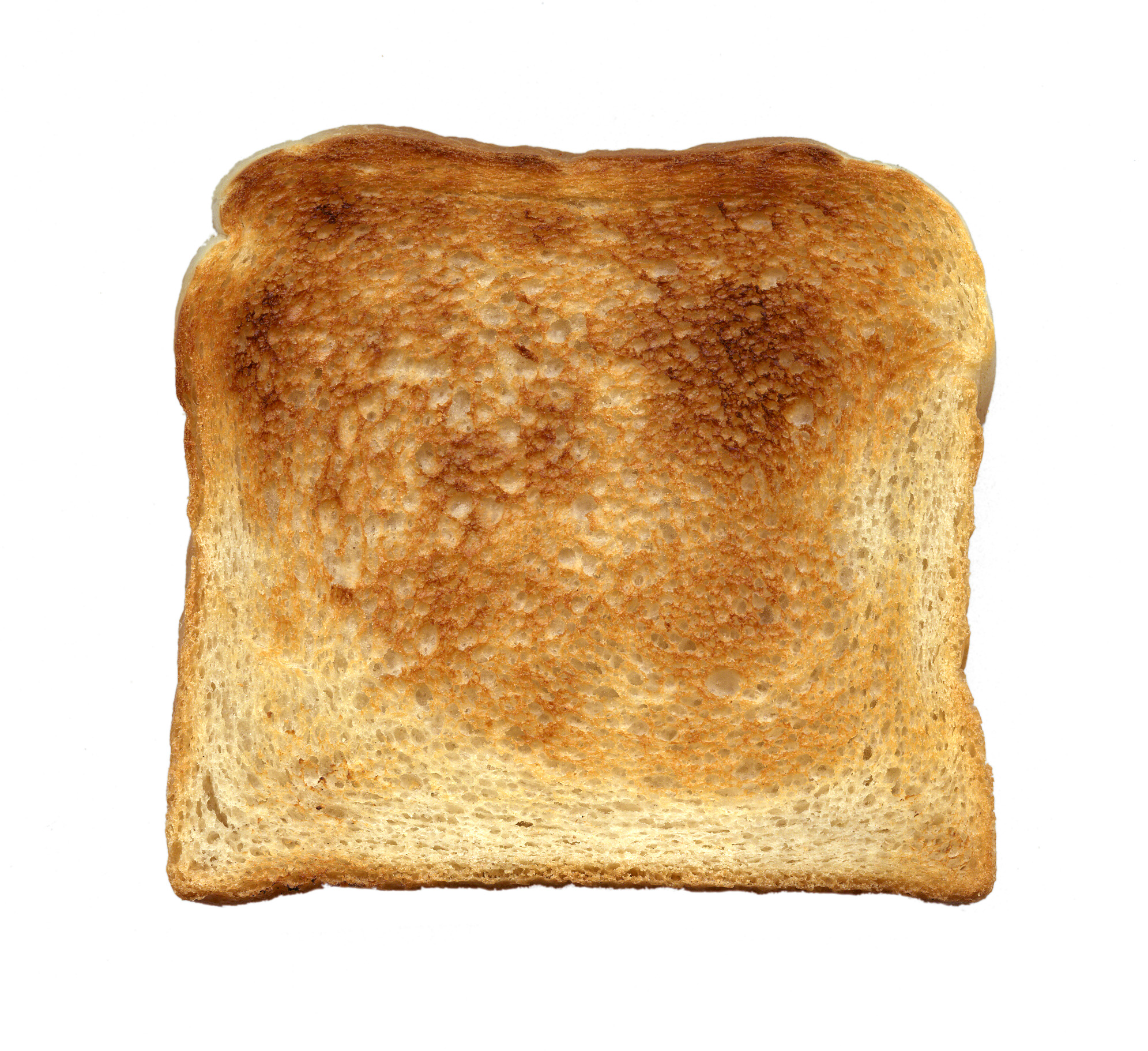
The BRAT diet: banana, rice, apple sauce, and toast

The BRAT diet consists of only bananas, rice, apple sauce, and toast.

==== No longer recommended ====
As of 2025, the BRAT diet is often not recommended by health professionals due to a lack of compelling scientific evidence for the intervention. The diet was first discussed in 1926 and was once recommended for people, particularly children, with gastrointestinal distress like vomiting, diarrhea, or gastroenteritis.

However, modern research has shown that the BRAT diet may be needlessly restrictive in many cases and may tend to limit important nutrients or food groups. The American Academy of Pediatrics states that most children should continue a normal, age appropriate diet. The foods from the BRAT diet may be added, but should not replace normal, tolerated foods. Sugary drinks and carbonated beverages should be avoided to help with indigestion and GI issues. The BRAT diet is no longer routinely recommended to those who have had stem cell transplants and have diarrhea due to graft-versus-host disease, as long-term use can lead to nutritional deficiencies.

Adding soothing foods like rice, bananas, or soluble fibers like pectin to the diet while suffering from diarrhea may help alleviate bouts of diarrhea and improve hydration status and stool consistency. However, some physicians have raised concerns that traditional diets like the BRAT diet may be nutritionally incomplete and deficient in energy, fat, protein, fiber, vitamin A, vitamin B_{12}, and calcium. Physicians Debora Duro and Christopher Duggan also argue that food restriction itself may be ineffective at alleviating diarrhea and may actually cause individuals to have diarrhea for longer periods, according to randomized clinical trials.

=== BRATT diet ===
The BRATT diet consists of bananas, rice, applesauce, toast, and tea.

=== BRATTY diet ===
The BRATTY diet consists of bananas, rice, applesauce, toast, tea, and yogurt.

=== CRAM diet ===
The CRAM diet consists of cereal, rice, applesauce, and milk. The CRAM diet has a higher protein and fat content than the BRAT diet. According to John Snyder, a professor of pediatrics at the University of California at San Francisco Medical Center and a member of the American Academy of Pediatrics subcommittee on treating acute diarrhea, the CRAM diet seems to ease the diarrhea symptoms faster.

== Controversy ==
Even though milk and other dairy products are permissible in a bland diet, consumption may interfere with the homeostatic processes involved in digestion; prominently for peptic ulcer patients. In an early study, milk was found to have a short-lived gastric acid neutralising effect; which may lead to milk-alkali syndrome and eventually arteriosclerotic heart disease if dietary intake is excessive and uncontrolled. Further research by McArthur, Hogan & Isenberg demonstrated a link between milk consumption and an increase in gastrin production almost equivalent to that of pentagastrin, which may be detrimental to the patients requiring a bland diet as an increased gastric acid output is induced and acts as an overcompensation to the increased (neutralised) pH.

== Need for hydration ==
Due to severe dehydration caused by both diarrhea and gastroenteritis, bland diets should be combined with oral rehydration therapy to replace the depleted electrolytes and avoid salt imbalance. Severe, untreated salt imbalance can result in "extreme weakness, confusion, coma, or death."

== Continued diarrhea while on a bland diet ==
Immediate medical attention is necessary if the diarrhea symptoms remain severe or if the child exhibits symptoms of dehydration, such as dry mouth, lack of urination, listlessness, or rapid heart rate. Medical attention is required when on a bland diet if any blood or mucus is present in the diarrhea, if the diarrhea is severe, or if it lasts longer than 3 days.
