= Bathroom privileges =

Rules for the use of toilets in settings such as schools, workplaces and hospitals

Bathroom privileges refers to the rules or the possibility of the use of a toilet. Most commonly, the term is used in the following settings:

- In schools, it refers to permission for students to leave the classroom during lessons. Often this is associated with certain regulations, such as usage of the hall pass.
- As a doctor's prescription, it refers to permission for a patient to use the facilities. This may be due to a medical condition requiring bed rest (e.g. high-risk pregnancy), or the avoidance of certain defecation postures (e.g. sitting or squatting) Still another example is "BRP for bowel movement only". On the other hand, if a patient has a communicable disease, the physician may wish to restrict the chances of it spreading by disallowing them from using the shared toilet on the ward.
- At some workplaces, it refers to formal rules, e.g. the number and the duration of the usage of the bathroom.
