= Itopride =

Chemical compound

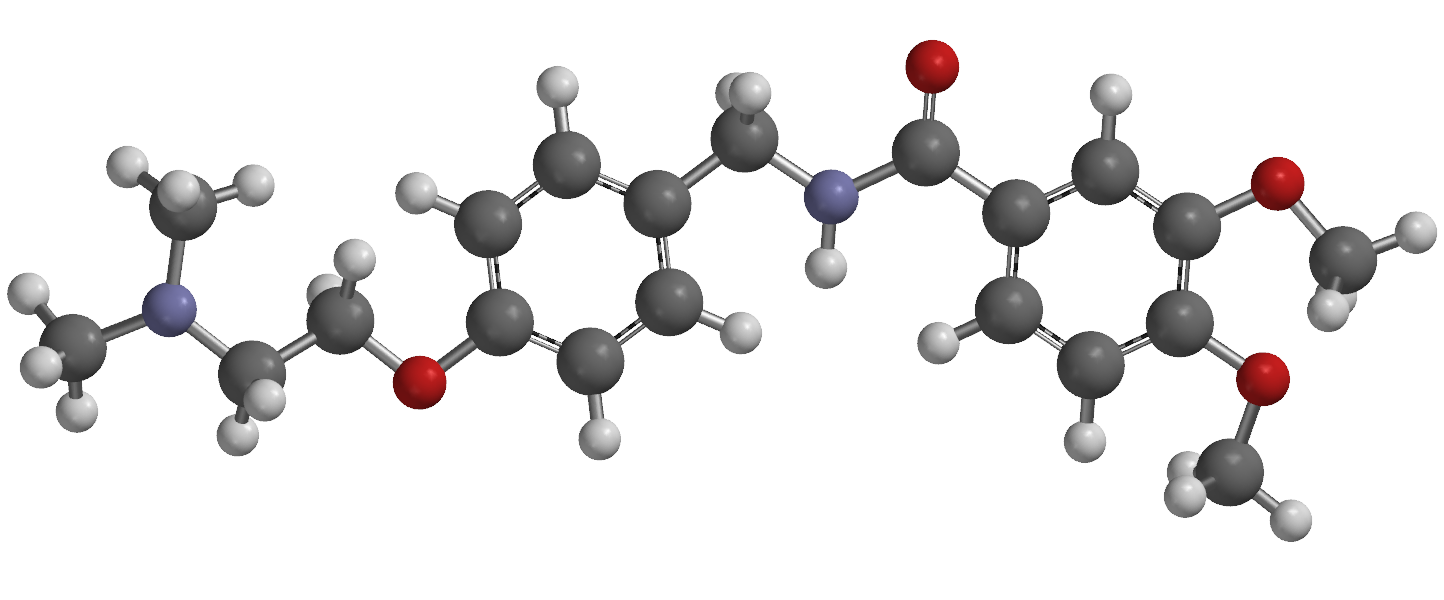

Clinical data
- Trade names: Ganaton
- AHFS/Drugs.com: International Drug Names
- Routes of administration: By mouth
- ATC code: A03FA07 (WHO)

Legal status
- Legal status: In general: ℞ (Prescription only)

Pharmacokinetic data
- Bioavailability: ~60% (T_{max} = 35±5 min)
- Protein binding: 96%
- Metabolism: Extensive hepatic (FMO1 and FMO3), primarily N-oxidation
- Elimination half-life: 5.7±0.3 hours
- Excretion: Renal (3.7–4.1% as unchanged itopride, 75.4–89.4% as itopride-N-oxide)

Identifiers
- IUPAC name: N-[[4-(2-Dimethylaminoethoxy)phenyl]methyl]-3,4-dimethoxybenzamide
- CAS Number: 122898-67-3; as HCl: 122892-31-3
- PubChem CID: 3792
- DrugBank: DB04924; as HCl: DBSALT002665
- ChemSpider: 3660
- UNII: 81BMQ80QRL; as HCl: 2H9NV66W0I
- KEGG: D08094; as HCl: D02729
- ChEBI: CHEBI:94809
- ChEMBL: ChEMBL2107457
- CompTox Dashboard (EPA): DTXSID7048320
- ECHA InfoCard: 100.222.888

Chemical and physical data
- Formula: C_{20}H_{26}N_{2}O_{4}
- Molar mass: 358.438 g·mol^{−1}
- 3D model (JSmol): Interactive image; as HCl: Interactive image
- SMILES: CN(C)CCOC1=CC=C(C=C1)CNC(=O)C2=CC(=C(C=C2)OC)OC; as HCl: Cl.COC1=CC=C(C=C1OC)C(=O)NCC1=CC=C(OCCN(C)C)C=C1
- InChI: InChI=1S/C20H26N2O4/c1-22(2)11-12-26-17-8-5-15(6-9-17)14-21-20(23)16-7-10-18(24-3)19(13-16)25-4/h5-10,13H,11-12,14H2,1-4H3,(H,21,23); Key:QQQIECGTIMUVDS-UHFFFAOYSA-N; as HCl: InChI=1S/C20H26N2O4.ClH/c1-22(2)11-12-26-17-8-5-15(6-9-17)14-21-20(23)16-7-10-18(24-3)19(13-16)25-4;/h5-10,13H,11-12,14H2,1-4H3,(H,21,23);1H; Key:ZTOUXLLIPWWHSR-UHFFFAOYSA-N-UHFFFAOYSA-N

Itopride (INN; brand name Ganaton) is a prokinetic benzamide derivative. These drugs inhibit dopamine and acetylcholine esterase enzyme and have a gastrokinetic effect. Itopride is indicated for the treatment of functional dyspepsia and other gastrointestinal conditions. It is a combined D_{2} receptor antagonist and acetylcholinesterase inhibitor. Itopride is the dimethoxy analog of trimethobenzamide.

== Medical uses ==
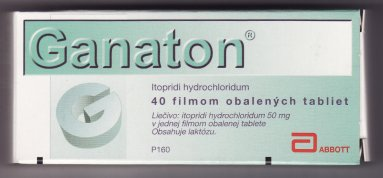
A blister package of Ganaton (Itopride) 50 mg tablets intended for distribution in the Slovak Republic.

Typically, itopride is indicated in the treatment of GI symptoms caused by reduced GI motility:

- dyspepsia of a non-ulcer/dysmotility type (gastric "fullness", discomfort, and possible pain)
- gastroparesis (delayed gastric emptying)
- anorexia
- heartburn
- regurgitation
- bloating
- nausea and vomiting
- other possible gastric, prolactin, or dopamine related conditions

Itopride was shown to significantly improve symptoms in patients with functional dyspepsia and motility disorders in placebo-controlled trials.

These studies concluded that the reduction in the severity of symptoms of functional dyspepsia after 8 weeks of treatment with itopride indicated that itopride was significantly superior to placebo and that itopride yielded a greater rate of response than placebo in significantly reducing pain and fullness.

== Adverse drug reactions ==
Central nervous system adverse effects do not tend to occur due to poor penetration across the blood brain barrier, although a slight raising of prolactin levels may occur. Raising of prolactin levels is more common with high dose regimes of itopride.

=== Cardiac studies ===
Itopride belongs to the same benzamide group as cisapride, a drug found to affect QT interval and possibly predispose those using it to cardiac arrhythmias. However, itopride does not have any adverse effect on the QT interval.

Later, in a study conducted with healthy adult volunteers, itopride was shown as unlikely to cause cardiac arrhythmias or ECG changes in part to the lack of significant interaction and metabolism via the cytochrome P450 enzyme pathway, unlike cisapride and mosapride, as it is metabolized by a different enzyme set. New molecular studies on guinea pig ventricular myocytes also supported the cardiac safety profile of itopride, as it did not affect certain potassium mechanisms that may have been affected by cisapride or mosapride. Moreover, itopride has no affinity for the 5-HT_{4} receptors, unlike other benzamides such as cisapride and mosapride, which are 5-HT_{4} agonists. The affinity of cisapride for 5-HT_{4} receptors in the heart has been implicated in the undesirable cardiac effects of cisapride itself.

The conclusion of this study revealed that itopride is devoid of any abnormal effect on QT interval. Therefore, it may be possible that itopride could be considered as a better and certainly safer prokinetic agent than either cisapride or mosapride, and itopride should also be considered a welcome treatment addition for symptomatic nonulcer dyspepsia and other gastric motility disorders.

== Pharmacology ==
Itopride acts as a selective dual D_{2} receptor antagonist and acetylcholinesterase inhibitor.

There is evidence that itopride may have prokinetic effects throughout the gastrointestinal tract from the stomach to the end of the colon. The pharmacokinetics of itopride appear to differ between Asian and Caucasian populations, with Caucasians having 30-50 percent lower blood levels of itopride after oral administration. Itopride poorly penetrates across the blood brain barrier because of its high polarity and thus itopride does not tend to cause any central nervous system adverse effects. Itopride has no effect on potassium channels.

Similarly to other D_{2} receptor antagonists, itopride has been found to dose-dependently increase prolactin levels.

=== Pharmacokinetics ===
After oral administration itopride undergoes rapid and extensive absorption with levels of itopride peaking in the blood plasma after only 35 minutes. Itopride is primarily eliminated via the kidneys having an elimination half-life of approximately 6 hours.

=== Mechanism of action ===
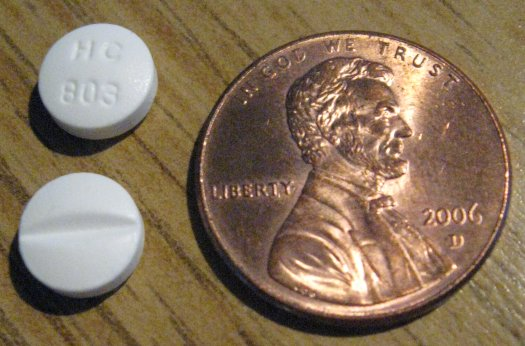
Ganaton (Itopride) 50 mg tablets. Engraving says "HC 803"

Itopride increases acetylcholine concentrations by inhibiting dopamine D2 receptors and acetylcholinesterase. Higher acetylcholine increases GI peristalsis, increases the lower esophageal sphincter pressure, stimulates gastric motility, accelerates gastric emptying, and improves gastro-duodenal coordination.

Itopride given as a single dose study found that it also raises levels of motilin, somatostatin and lowers levels of cholecystokinin, as well as adrenocorticotropic hormone. These effects may also contribute to itopride's pharmacology.

== Society and culture ==
=== Names ===
Itopride is available under various brand names including Ganaton (Japan, India, Czech Republic, Russian Federation), Itoprid PMCS (Czech Republic, Slovakia), Itomed (Kyrgyzstan, Kazakhstan, Moldova, Russia, Ukraine, Uzbekistan), Prokit (Poland), and Itogard (Nepal). In Mexico, itopride is sold by Takeda Laboratories under the brand name Dagla. In Bulgaria and other countries of East Europe itopride is sold by Zentiva under the brand name Zirid
