= Small intestinal bacterial overgrowth =

- Other names: bacterial overgrowth, small bowel bacterial overgrowth syndrome (SBBOS)
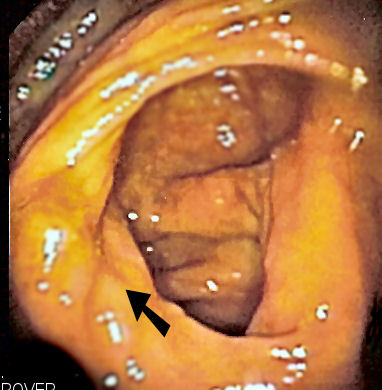
- The ileocecal valve prevents reflux of bacteria from the colon into the small bowel. Resection of the valve can lead to bacterial overgrowth.
- Specialty: Gastroenterology

Small intestinal bacterial overgrowth (SIBO), also termed bacterial overgrowth, or small bowel bacterial overgrowth syndrome (SBBOS), is a disorder of excessive bacterial growth in the small intestine. Unlike the colon (or large bowel), which is rich with bacteria, the small intestine usually has fewer than 100,000 organisms per millilitre. Patients with SIBO typically develop symptoms which may include nausea, bloating, diarrhea, constipation, malnutrition, weight loss, brain fog, and malabsorption by various mechanisms.

The diagnosis of SIBO is made by several techniques, with the gold standard being an aspirate from the jejunum that grows more than 10^{5} bacteria per millilitre. Risk factors for the development of SIBO include dysmotility; anatomical disturbances in the bowel, including fistulae, diverticula and blind loops created after surgery, and resection of the ileo-cecal valve; gastroenteritis-induced alterations to the small intestine; and the use of certain medications, including proton pump inhibitors.

SIBO is treated with an elemental diet or antibiotics, which may be given cyclically to prevent tolerance to the antibiotics, sometimes followed by prokinetic drugs to prevent recurrence if dysmotility is a suspected cause.

== Definition ==
SIBO may be defined as an increased number of bacteria measured via exhaled hydrogen and/or methane gas following the ingestion of glucose or lactulose, or via analysis of small bowel aspirate fluid. Nevertheless, as of 2020, the definition of SIBO as a clinical entity lacks precision and consistency; it is a term generally applied to a clinical disorder where symptoms, clinical signs, and/or laboratory abnormalities are attributed to changes in the numbers of bacteria or the composition of the bacterial population in the small intestine. The main obstacle to accurately defining SIBO is limited understanding of the normal intestinal microbial population. Future advances in sampling technology and techniques for counting bacterial populations and their metabolites should provide much-needed clarity.

=== Methane-dominant SIBO ===
The archaeon Methanobrevibacter smithii has been associated with symptoms of SIBO, which result in a positive methane breath test. In addition to the archaeon, a few bacteria can also produce methane, such as members of the Clostridium and Bacteroides genus. Production of methane, therefore, may not be bacterial, nor limited to the small intestine, and it has been proposed that the condition should be classified as a separate 'intestinal methanogen overgrowth' (IMO).

== Signs and symptoms ==
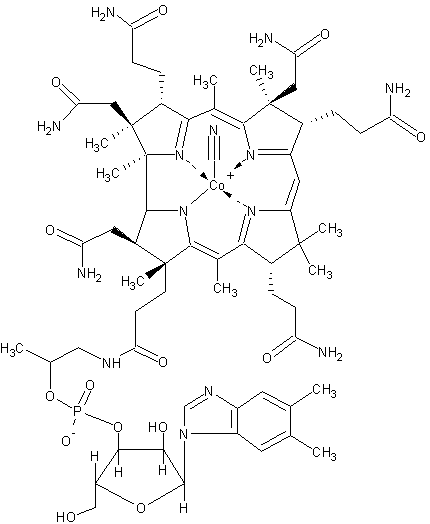
Deficiency of vitamin B_{12} can occur in SIBO.

Symptoms traditionally linked to SIBO include bloating, diarrhea, constipation, and abdominal pain/discomfort. Steatorrhea may be seen in more severe cases.

SIBO can cause a variety of symptoms, many of which are also found in other conditions, making the diagnosis challenging at times. Many of the symptoms are due to malabsorption of nutrients due to the effects of bacteria, which either metabolize nutrients or cause inflammation of the small bowel, impairing absorption. The symptoms of SIBO include nausea, flatus, constipation, bloating, abdominal distension, abdominal pain or discomfort, diarrhea, fatigue, and weakness. SIBO also causes an increased permeability of the small intestine. Some patients may lose weight. Children with SIBO may develop malnutrition and have difficulty attaining proper growth. Steatorrhea, a sticky type of diarrhea where fat is not properly absorbed and spills into the stool, may also occur.

People with long-term SIBO may develop complications as a result of malabsorption of nutrients. Blood tests may show increased level of folate (vitamin B_{9}). Less commonly, there may be vitamin B_{12} deficiency or other nutritional deficiencies. The combination of elevated folate and low vitamin B_{12} is unusual. Anemia may occur from a variety of mechanisms, as many of the nutrients involved in the production of red blood cells are absorbed in the affected small bowel. Iron is absorbed in the more proximal parts of the small bowel, the duodenum and jejunum, and patients with malabsorption of iron can develop a microcytic anemia, with small red blood cells. Vitamin B_{12} is absorbed in the last part of the small bowel, the ileum, and patients who have malabsorption of vitamin B_{12} can develop a megaloblastic anemia with large red blood cells.

== Causes ==
E. coli, shown in this electron micrograph, is commonly isolated in patients with SIBO.

Certain people are more predisposed to the development of SIBO because of certain risk factors. These factors can be grouped into four categories: (1) motility disorders, impaired movement of the small bowel, or anatomical changes that lead to stasis (a state in which the normal flow of a body liquid stops); (2) disorders of the immune system; (3) interference with the production of proteolytic enzymes, gastric acid, or bile; and (4) conditions that cause more bacteria from the colon to enter the small bowel.

Absence or impairment of the migrating motor complex (MMC), a cyclical motility pattern in the small intestine, and phase III of the MMC in particular, is associated with the development of SIBO. Problems with motility may either be diffuse or localized to particular areas.

MMC impairment may be a result of post-infectious IBS, drug use, or intestinal pseudo-obstruction among other causes. There is an overlap in findings between tropical sprue, post-infectious IBS and SIBO in the pathophysiology of the three conditions and also SIBO can similarly sometimes be triggered by an acute gastrointestinal infection. As of 2020, there is still controversy about the role of SIBO in the pathogenesis of common functional symptoms such as those considered to be components of IBS. Diseases like scleroderma cause diffuse slowing of the bowel, leading to increased bacterial concentrations. More commonly, the small bowel may have anatomical problems, such as out-pouchings known as diverticula that can cause bacteria to accumulate. After surgery involving the stomach and duodenum (most commonly with Billroth II antrectomy), a blind loop may be formed, leading to stasis of flow of intestinal contents. This can cause overgrowth, and is termed blind loop syndrome.

Systemic or metabolic disorders may lead to conditions allowing SIBO as well. For example, diabetes can cause intestinal neuropathy, pancreatitis, leading to pancreatic insufficiency can impair digestive enzyme production, and bile may be affected as part of cirrhosis of the liver. The use of proton pump inhibitors, a class of medication used to reduce stomach acid, is associated with an increased risk of developing SIBO.

Finally, abnormal connections between the bacteria-rich colon and the small bowel can increase the bacterial load in the small bowel. Patients with Crohn's disease or other diseases of the ileum may require surgery that removes the ileocecal valve connecting the small and large bowel; this leads to an increased reflux of bacteria into the small bowel. After bariatric surgery for obesity, connections between the stomach and the ileum can be formed, which may increase bacterial load in the small bowel.

=== Related conditions ===
In recent years, several proposed links between SIBO and other disorders have been made. Usually, such research uses breath testing as an indirect investigation for SIBO.

==== Irritable bowel syndrome ====
Some studies reported that up to 80% of patients with irritable bowel syndrome (IBS) have SIBO (using the hydrogen breath test). IBS-D is associated with elevated hydrogen numbers on breath tests, while IBS-C is associated with elevated methane numbers on breath tests. Subsequent studies demonstrated statistically significant reduction in IBS symptoms following therapy for SIBO.

Various mechanisms are involved in the development of diarrhea and IBS-D in SIBO. First, the excessive bacterial concentrations can cause direct inflammation of the small bowel cells, leading to an inflammatory diarrhea. The malabsorption of lipids, proteins, and carbohydrates may cause poorly digestible products to enter the large bowel. This can cause an osmotic diarrhea or stimulate the colonic cells to cause a secretory diarrhea.

There is a lack of consensus regarding the suggested link between IBS and SIBO. Other authors concluded that the abnormal breath results so common in IBS patients do not suggest SIBO, and state that "abnormal fermentation timing and dynamics of the breath test findings support a role for abnormal intestinal bacterial distribution in IBS." There is consensus that breath tests are abnormal in IBS; however, the disagreement lies in whether this is representative of SIBO.

== Diagnosis ==
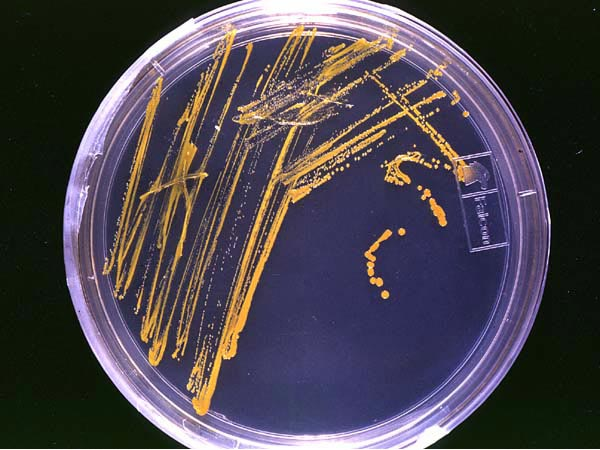
Aspiration of bacteria from the jejunum is the gold standard for diagnosis. A bacterial load of greater than 10^{5} bacteria per milliliter is diagnostic for SIBO.

=== D-xylose absorption test ===
Malabsorption can be detected by a test called the D-xylose absorption test. Xylose is a sugar that does not require enzymes to be digested. The D-xylose test involves having a patient drink a certain quantity of D-xylose, and measuring levels in the urine and blood; if there is no evidence of D-xylose in the urine and blood, it suggests that the small bowel is not absorbing properly (as opposed to problems with enzymes required for digestion).

=== Small bowel aspirate culture ===
The gold standard for detection of SIBO is aspiration and culture of fluid from the jejunum. More than 10^{5} colony-forming units (more than 100,000 bacteria) per milliliter from the small bowel suggests SIBO. The normal small bowel has less than 10^{4} bacteria per millilitre. However, some experts consider aspiration of more than 10^{3} positive if the flora is predominantly colonic-type bacteria, as these types of bacteria are considered pathological in excessive numbers in the small intestine. The reliability of aspiration in the diagnosis of SIBO has been questioned, as SIBO can be patchy, and the reproducibility can be as low as 38%. Some doctors factor in a patient's response to treatment as part of the diagnosis.

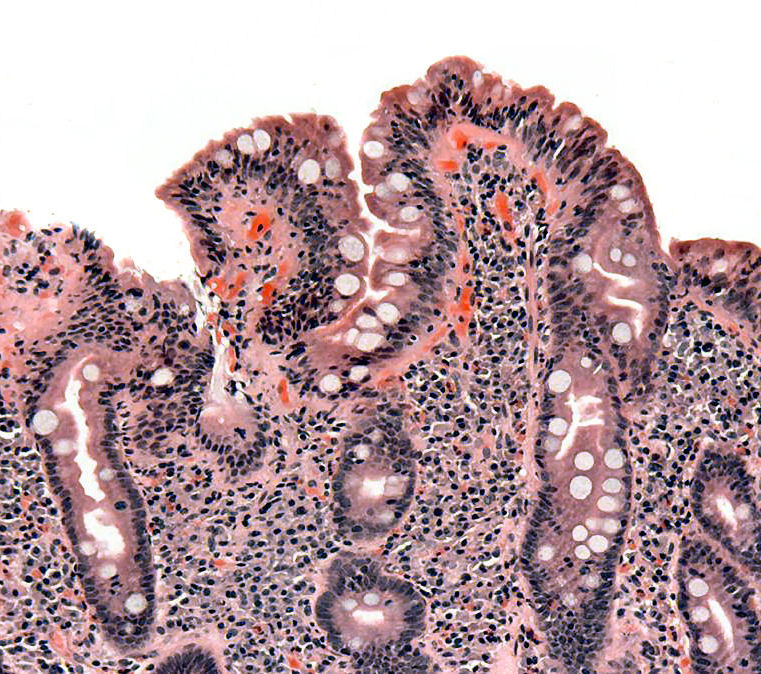
Biopsies of the small bowel in SIBO can mimic celiac disease, with partial villous atrophy.

=== Breath tests ===
Breath tests for SIBO are either based on bacterial metabolism of carbohydrates to hydrogen, methane, or hydrogen sulfide; or based on the detection of by-products of the digestion of carbohydrates that are not usually metabolized. The hydrogen breath test involves having the patient fast for a minimum of 12 hours, then having them drink a substrate, usually glucose or lactulose, then measuring expired hydrogen and methane concentrations typically over several hours. It compares well to jejunal aspirates in making the diagnosis of SIBO. Carbon-13 (^{13}C) and carbon-14 (^{14}C) based tests have also been developed based on the bacterial metabolism of D-xylose. Increased bacterial concentrations are also involved in the deconjugation of bile acids. The glycocholic acid breath test involves the administration of the bile acid ^{14}C glycocholic acid, and the detection of ^{14}CO_{2}, which would be elevated in SIBO.

Breath tests may be an imperfect test for SIBO. In some people, methanogens may reside in the mouth, as evidenced by reductions in breath methane levels following mouthwash with chlorhexidine. This may affect results from hydrogen-methane breath testing. Breath tests give multiple false positives (a positive test result when in reality the person does not have the condition). On the other hand, breath tests are commonly used because they are non invasive and not expensive.

=== Other diagnostic methods ===
Some physicians suggest that if the suspicion of SIBO is high enough, the best diagnostic test is a trial of treatment. If the symptoms improve, an empiric diagnosis of SIBO can be made.

There is insufficient evidence to support the use of inflammatory markers, such as fecal calprotectin, to detect SIBO.

== Treatment ==
Treatment strategies should focus on identifying and correcting the root causes, resolving nutritional deficiencies, and administering antibiotics. This approach is especially important for patients with indigestion and malabsorption. Whether antibiotics should be a first-line treatment is debated. Some experts recommend probiotics as first-line therapy, with antibiotics reserved as a second-line treatment for more severe cases of SIBO. Prokinetic drugs are other options, but human research is limited. A variety of antibiotics, including tetracycline, amoxicillin-clavulanate, metronidazole, neomycin, cephalexin and trimethoprim-sulfamethoxazole have been used; however, the best evidence is for the use of rifaximin, a poorly-absorbed antibiotic. Although IBS has been shown to respond to the treatment of poorly-absorbed antibiotics, there is limited evidence on the effectiveness of such treatment in cases of SIBO, and as of 2020, randomized controlled trials are still needed to confirm the eradicating effect of such treatment in SIBO. A course of one week of antibiotics is usually sufficient to treat the condition. However, if the condition recurs, antibiotics can be given cyclically to prevent tolerance. For example, antibiotics may be given for a week, followed by three weeks off antibiotics, followed by another week of treatment. Alternatively, the choice of antibiotic used can be cycled. There is still limited data to guide the clinician in developing antibiotic strategies for SIBO. Therapy remains, for the most part, empiric. However, concerns exist about the potential risks of long-term broad-spectrum antibiotic therapy.

Probiotics are bacterial preparations that alter the bacterial flora in the bowel to cause a beneficial effect. Animal research has demonstrated that probiotics have barrier-enhancing, antibacterial, immune-modulating, and anti-inflammatory effects, which may have a positive effect in the management of SIBO in humans. Lactobacillus casei is effective in improving breath hydrogen scores after six weeks of treatment, presumably by suppressing levels of a small intestinal SIBO of fermenting bacteria. Lactobacillus plantarum, Lactobacillus acidophilus, and Lactobacillus casei have all demonstrated effectiveness in the treatment and management of SIBO. Conversely, Lactobacillus fermentum and Saccharomyces boulardii have been found to be ineffective. A combination of Lactobacillus plantarum and Lactobacillus rhamnosus is effective in suppressing SIBO of abnormal gas producing organisms in the small intestine.

A combination of probiotic strains has been found to produce better results than therapy with the antibiotic drug metronidazole.

An elemental diet has been shown to be highly effective for eliminating SIBO with a two-week diet demonstrating 73% efficacy in normalizing breath test levels. An elemental diet works via providing nutrition for the individual while depriving the bacteria of a food source. Additional treatment options include the use of prokinetic drugs such as 5-HT_{4} receptor agonists or motilin agonists to extend the SIBO free period after treatment with an elemental diet or antibiotics. A diet void of certain foods that feed the bacteria can help alleviate the symptoms. For example, if the symptoms are caused by SIBO feeding on indigestible carbohydrate rich foods, following a low-FODMAP diet may help.

== Epidemiology ==
According to breath testing, SIBO may be present in 34% of people with gastrointestinal symptoms. SIBO affects males and females in equal proportion. Race does not affect the risk of SIBO.

== See also ==
- Achlorhydria
- Intestinal methanogen overgrowth
