= Blind loop syndrome =

- Other names: Stagnant loop syndrome
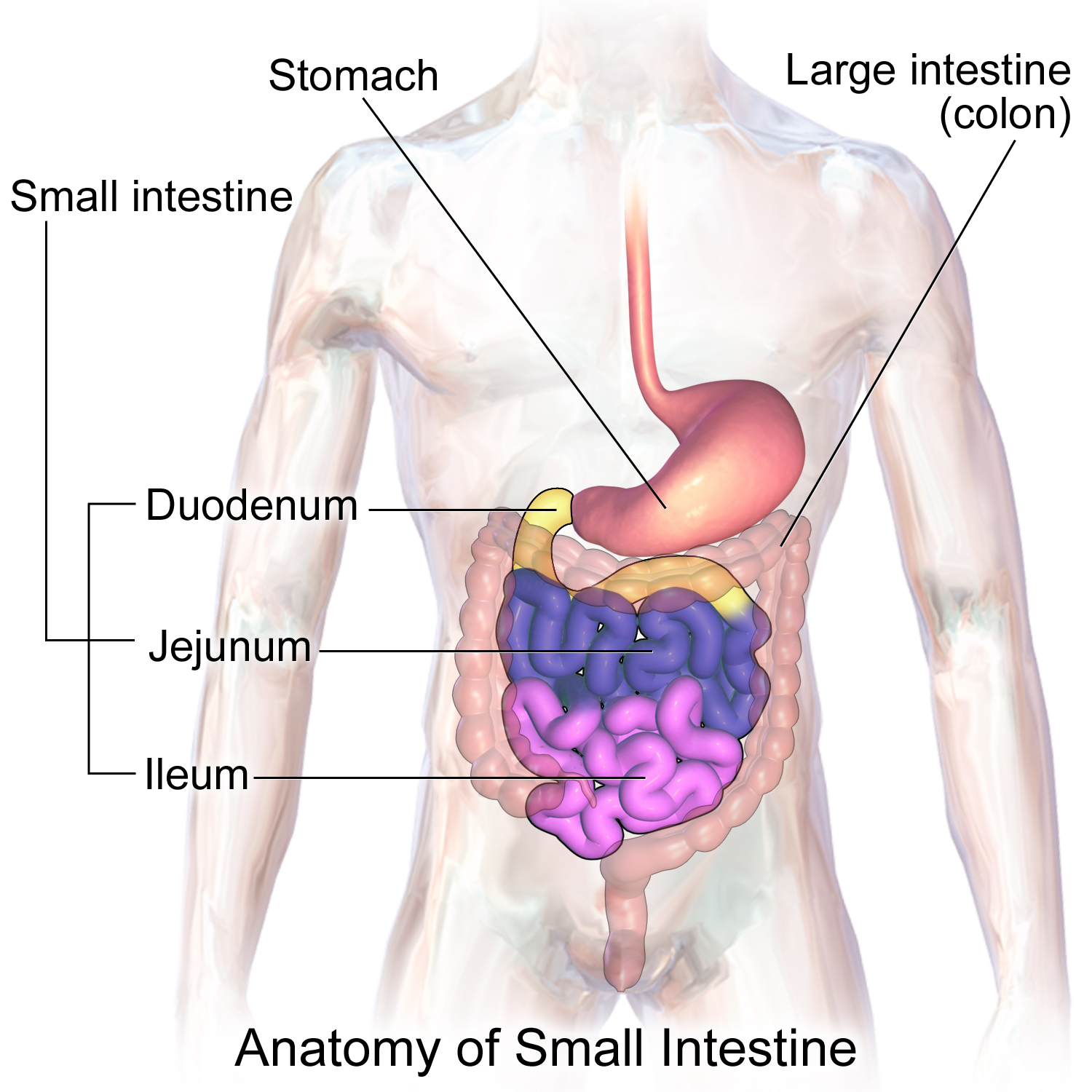
- Specialty: Gastroenterology

Blind loop syndrome, also known as stagnant loop syndrome, is a state that occurs when the normal bacterial flora of the small intestine proliferates to numbers that cause significant derangement to the normal physiological processes of digestion and absorption. In some cases of blind loop syndrome, overgrowth of pathogenic non-commensal bacteria has also been noted. It has long been understood that from birth, and throughout life, large amounts of bacteria reside symbiotically within animal gastrointestinal tracts such as the human gastrointestinal tract. The understanding of this gut flora has even led to novel treatments for bowel irregularity that utilize so called "probiotics" or good bacteria that aid in normal digestion. The problem of blind loop syndrome arises when the bacterial colonies residing in the upper gastrointestinal tract begin to grow out of control or are altered in their makeup thereby creating a burden on the normal physiological processes occurring in the small intestine. This results in problems, among others, of: vitamin B12 deficiency, fat malabsorption and steatorrhea, fat-soluble vitamin deficiencies and intestinal wall injury.

== Symptoms and signs ==
Most of the symptoms of blind loop syndrome are non specific but nevertheless warrant the utmost attention. These include:

- Loss of appetite
- Nausea
- Flatulence
- Diarrhea
- Fullness after a meal
- Fatty stools (steatorrhea)
- Unintentional weight loss
- Generalised weakness

As a result of the concomitant vitamin and mineral deficiencies that occur as a result of the malabsorption associated with blind loop syndrome patients with advanced cases should be investigated for:

- Vitamin B12 deficiency
- Folate deficiency
- Iron deficiency
- Vitamin E deficiency

== Causes ==
Blind loop syndrome is a complication of surgical operations of the abdomen, as well as inflammatory bowel disease or scleroderma. Another cause is jejunoileal diverticula.

== Pathophysiology ==
The overgrowth of bacteria in the small intestine is prevented by various mechanical and chemical factors which include the constant peristaltic movement of contents along the length of the gastrointestinal tract and the antibacterial properties of gastric secretions, pancreatic secretions and bile.

It follows that a disruption of any of these factors could lead to bacterial overgrowth and indeed blind loop syndrome has been found to occur in persons with anatomical anomalies that result in stagnation. Blind loop syndrome has also been associated with achlorhydria, dysmotility, fistulae, and strictures. Chronic or high dose opioid therapy may contribute to blind loop syndrome by reducing gastric motility.

Due to the disruption of digestive processes by the overgrowth of intestinal bacteria; malabsorption of bile salts, fat and fat-soluble vitamins, protein and carbohydrates results in damage to the mucosal lining of the intestine by bacteria or via the production of toxic metabolites.

== Diagnosis ==
A physical examination may reveal a mass or distention of the abdomen. Tests which may be useful for diagnosis include:

- Abdominal X-ray
- Abdominal CT scan
- Contrast enema study

== Treatment ==
The treatment of blind loop syndrome follows two basic principles. When a patient presents with symptoms of blind loop syndrome, the treating physician basically has two recognized options for management:

- Test-and-treat
- Treat empirically

=== Test-and-treat method ===
Although it would seem to be the better way to go in terms of management, there has been recent criticism on the need for such testing because of reliability issues. However, there are options such as the glucose breath test and jejunal aspiration the explanations of which are beyond the scope of this current article.

=== Treating empirically ===
The "treat empirically" route also has its difficulties, which have all come under wide debate and study. Recommendations are varied but seem to find some common ground around the notion that treatment should be individualized to the specific circumstances under which a patient has developed blind loop syndrome since these circumstances affect the complex microbial make up of the affected bowel. Tetracyclines have been the mainstay of treatment for blind loop syndrome, but recent studies have concluded rifaximin to be very effective in the treatment of blind loop syndrome. However, a study by Di Stefano et al. concluded metronidazole to be more effective than rifaximin in the treatment of blind loop syndrome.

=== Surgical management ===
Surgical management is reserved for fixing anatomical causes of bowel obstruction that interfere with normal function once they are amenable to such intervention. These conditions include:

- Strictures
- Fistulae
- Diverticula

== See also ==
- Small intestinal bacterial overgrowth (SIBO)
