= Prokinetic agent =

Medication to promote gastrointestinal emptying

A prokinetic agent (also prokineticin, gastroprokinetic agent, gastrokinetic agent or propulsive) is a type of drug which enhances gastrointestinal motility by increasing the frequency or strength of contractions, but without disrupting their rhythm. They are used to treat certain gastrointestinal symptoms, including abdominal discomfort, bloating, constipation, heart burn, nausea, and vomiting; and certain gastrointestinal disorders, including irritable bowel syndrome, gastritis, gastroparesis, and functional dyspepsia.

Most prokinetic agents are grouped under the Anatomical Therapeutic Chemical Classification System (a World Health Organization drug classification system), as ATC code A03F.

== Pharmacodynamics ==
Activation of a wide range of serotonin receptors by serotonin itself or by certain prokinetic drugs results in enhanced gastrointestinal motility.

Other prokinetic drugs may increase acetylcholine concentrations by stimulating the M_{1} receptor which causes acetylcholine release, or by inhibiting the enzyme acetylcholinesterase which metabolizes acetylcholine. Higher acetylcholine levels increase gastrointestinal peristalsis and further increase pressure on the lower esophageal sphincter, thereby stimulating gastrointestinal motility, accelerating gastric emptying, and improving gastro-duodenal coordination.

The 5-HT_{4} receptor is thought to play a significant role in both the physiology and pathophysiology of GI tract motility. Therefore, 5-HT_{4} receptors have been identified as potential therapeutic targets for diseases related to GI dysmotility such as chronic constipation. Some of these prokinetic agents, such as mosapride and cisapride, classic benzamides, have only moderate affinity for 5HT_{4} receptors. In recent years, it has become clear that the selectivity profile is a major determinant of the risk-benefit profile of this class of agent. As such, the relatively poor selectivity profile of cisapride versus other receptors (especially hERG [human ether-a-go-go K^{+}] channels) contributes to its potential to cause cardiac arrhythmias. Prucalopride, a first in class benzofuran, is a selective, high affinity serotonin (5-HT_{4}) receptor agonist that stimulates colonic mass movements, which provide the main propulsive force to defecation. SSRIs have been found to have prokinetic actions on the small intestine.

Other molecules, including macrolides such as mitemcinal and erythromycin, have affinity for the motilin receptor where they act as agonists resulting in prokinetic properties.

== Research ==
Animal research has found that supplementation with the probiotics Lactobacillus rhamnosus and Bifidobacterium lactis enhances the speed and strength of phase III of the migrating motor complex in the small intestine resulting in reduced small intestinal bacterial overgrowth and bacterial translocation.

Research in rats has found that supplementation with Lactobacillus acidophilus and Bifidobacterium bifidum increases small intestinal motility with a measurable decrease in the duration of migrating motor complex cycles. A further study found that in rats supplemented with a diet of Lactobacillus rhamnosus and Bifidobacterium lactis, the number and velocity of phase iii of the migrating motor complex increased. These effects make the small intestine more effective at propelling food, bacteria and luminal secretions into the colon. Bifidobacterium bifidum in combination with Lactobacillus acidophilus accelerated small intestine transit in rats.

Research into the prokinetic effects of probiotics on the gastrointestinal tract has also been conducted in humans. Lactobacillus reuteri in infants and Lactobacillus casei and Bifidobacterium breve in children have been found to be effective in the treatment of constipation. Lactobacillus plantarum, in adults has been found to increase defecation frequency.

== Examples ==
- Cisapride
- Domperidone
- Itopride
- Mosapride
- Metoclopramide
- Prucalopride
- Renzapride
- Tegaserod
- Mitemcinal
- Levosulpiride
- Cinitapride
- Linaclotide
