= Electrogastrogram =

- Purpose: detects, analyzes and records the myoelectrical signals that are generated by the smooth muscle activity of the stomach, intestines and other smooth muscle containing organs.

An electrogastrogram (EGG) is a computer generated graphic produced by electrogastrography, which detects, analyzes and records the myoelectrical signal generated by the movement of the smooth muscle of the stomach, intestines and other smooth muscle containing organs. An electrogastroenterogram or electroviscerogram (or gastroenterogram) is a similar display of the recording of myoelectrical activity of gastrointestinal or other organs which are able to generate myoelectrical activity.

These names are made of different parts: electro, because it is related to electrical activity, gastro, Greek for stomach, entero or viscero, Greek for intestines, gram, a Greek root meaning "to write".

An electrogastrogram (EGG), electroviscerogram (EVG) or a gastroenterogram are similar in principle to an electrocardiogram (ECG) in that sensors on the skin detect electrical signals indicative of muscular activity within. Where the electrocardiogram detects muscular activity in various regions of the heart, the electrogastrogram or electroviscerogram detects the myoelectrical activity of the wave-like contractions of the stomach, intestines or other organs (peristalsis).

Walter C. Alvarez discovered the EGG signal and pioneered early studies of electrogastrography in 1921–22.

== Physiological basis ==
Motility of gastrointestinal tract (GI tract) results from coordinated contractions of smooth muscle, which in turn derive from two basic patterns of electrical activity across the membranes of smooth muscle cells—slow waves and action potentials. Slow waves are initiated by pacemakers—the interstitial cells of Cajal (ICC). Slow wave frequency varies in the different organs of the GI tract and is characteristic for that organ. They set the maximum frequency at which the muscle can contract:

- stomach – about 3 waves in a minute,
- duodenum – about 12 waves in a minute,
- jejunum – about 11 waves in a minute.
- ileum – about 8 waves in a minute,
- rectum – about 17 waves in a minute.

The electrical activity or more properly termed myoelectrical activity of the GI tract can be subdivided into two categories: electrical control activity (ECA) and electrical response activity (ERA). ECA is characterized by regularly recurring electrical potentials, originating in the gastric pacemaker located in the body of stomach. The slow waves are not a direct reason of peristalsis of a GI tract, but a correlation between deviations of slow waves from norm and motility abnormalities however is proved.

== Cutaneous electrogastrography ==
Recording of the Electrogastrogram can be made from either the gastrointestinal surface mucosa, serosa, or the external skin surface. The cutaneous electrogastrography provides an indirect representation of the electrical activity, that has been demonstrated in numerous studies to exactly correspond to simultaneous recordings of the mucosa or serosa. Since it is much easier to perform, the cutaneous electrogastrography has been used most frequently.

Several EGG signals may be recorded from various standardized positions on the abdominal wall, However, for maximal accuracy and analysis it is important to select the one channel with the highest amplitude. Each channel usually consists of three Ag-AgCl electrodes. Recordings are made both fasting (usually 10–30 minutes) and after a stimulation meal (usually 30–60 minutes) with the patient lying quietly. The stimulation meal may vary but the most commonly used medium is room temperature water. Deviations from the normal frequency may be referred to as alterations in the gastric myoelectrical activity (GMA) or intestinal myoelectrical activity(IMA), These include: 1) bradygastria GMA, 2) tachygastria GMA, or 3) 3 cycle per minute hypernormal GMA or hyponormal GMA .

In normal individuals the power of the electrical signals increases after the meal. In patients with abnormalities of stomach and/or gastrointestinal motility, the rhythm often is irregular or there is no post-stimulation meal increase in electrical power.

=== Bradygastria, normogastria and tachygastria ===
Terms bradygastria and tachygastria are used at the description of deviations of frequency of an electric signal from slow waves are initiated by pacemaker in the stomach from normal frequency of 3 cycles per minute.

A bradygastria is defined, as decreased rate of myoelectrical activity in the stomach, as less than 2.5 cycles per minute for at least 1 minute.

A tachygastria is defined, as increased rate of myoelectrical activity in the stomach, as more than 3.75 cycles per minute for at least 1 minute.

A bradygastria and tachygastria may be associated with nausea, gastroparesis, irritable bowel syndrome, and functional dyspepsia.

=== CPT and HCPCS codes for electrogastrography ===
There are following Current Procedural Terminology (CPT) and Healthcare Common Procedure Coding System (HCPCS) codes (maintained by the American Medical Association) for cutaneous electrogastrography:

CPT/HCPCS-code	Procedure
91132	Electrogastrography, diagnostic, transcutaneous
91133	Electrogastrography, diagnostic, transcutaneous; with provocative testing

== Electrogastroenterography ==
An electrogastroenterography (EGEG) is based that different organs of a GI tract give different frequency slow wave.

Organ of gastrointestinal tract	Investigated range (Hz)	Frequency number (i)
Large intestine	0.01 – 0.03	5
Stomach	0.03 – 0.07	1
Ileum	0.07 – 0.13	4
Jejunum	0.13 – 0.18	3
Duodenum	0.18 – 0.25	2

EGEG electrodes are as much as possible removed from a stomach and an intestines—usually three electrodes are placed on the extremities. It allows to receive stabler and comparable results.

=== Computer analysis ===
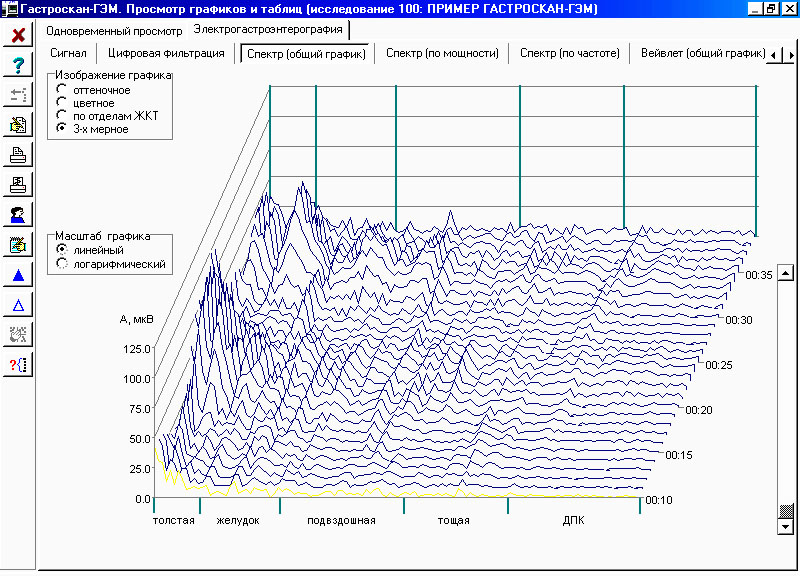
3D graph of a human gastroenterogramm: electrical signals from GI smooth muscle (in μV) on the vertical y-axis; from left to right on the x-axis: large intestine, stomach, ileum, jejunum, duodenum. The time (in minutes) is drawn on the z-axis.

An electrogastroenterography analysis program calculate

- P(i) – capacities of an electric signal separately from each of organ of GI tract in corresponding range of frequencies:

$$P(i) = \sum_{n=st_i}^{n=fin_i} |S(n)|^2,    i = 1, \dots, 5$$

where S(n) – spectral components in the rank from st_{i} to fin_{i} (defined by received investigated range of this organ of GI tract) by Discrete Fourier transform of the electric signal from GI tract.

- PS – the general (total) capacity of an electric signal from five parts of GI tract:

$$PS = \sum_{i=1}^{i=5} P(i).$$

- P(i)/PS – the relative electric activity.
- Kritm(i) – rhythm factor

$$Kritm (i) =  \frac{1}{fin_i -st_i} \sum_{n=st_i}^{n=fin_i -1} |S(n)-S(n-1)|,    i = 1, \dots, 5$$

EGEG parameters for normal patients:

Organ of gastrointestinal tract	Electric activity P(i)/PS	Rhythm factor Kritm(i)	P(i)/P(i+1)
Stomach	22.4±11.2	4.85±2.1	10.4±5.7
Duodenum	2.1±1.2	0.9±0.5	0.6±0.3
Jejunum	3.35±1.65	3.43±1.5	0.4±0.2
Ileum	8.08±4.01	4.99±2.5	0.13±0.08
Large intestine	64.04±32.01	22.85±9.8	—

== Psychological applications ==
Psychologists have performed psychophysiological studies to see what happens in the body during affective experiences. Electrogastrograms have recently been used to test physiological arousal, which was already determined by measures such as heart rate, electrodermal skin responses, and changes in hormone levels in saliva.

Currently, a pattern of interest to psychologists is an increase in bradygastria, which is when electrical activity in the stomach drops to below 2 cpm resulting in a slower stomach rhythm, when exposed to disgusting stimuli, which may be a precursor to nausea and vomiting, both physiological responses to disgust. In this study, the presence of bradygastria was able to predict trait and state disgust, which no other physiological measure used in the study was able to detect. This abnormal myoelectrical activity is usually combined with other precursors to nausea and vomiting, such as increased salivary production, which further supports the idea that these rhythms show early signs of nausea and vomiting. These reactions are viewed as a way in which the body rejects unhealthy foods, which is linked with the view that disgust is an evolutionary adaptation to help humans avoid consuming toxic substances.

During sham feeding sessions of both appetizing and unappetizing foods, 3 cycles per minute (cpm) power was measured. During the sham feeding of appetizing foods, 3cpm power increased. This increase was not reported in the sham feeding of unappetizing foods. The researchers concluded that the presence of this pattern seems to mark the beginning of the body preparing for digestion, and the absence of this pattern in the disgust condition could indicate that the body is readying to reject the food. The increase of 3cpm power is also linked with increased saliva and digestive juice production, all of which support the idea that this reflex, called the cephalic-vagal reflex, is the precursor of digestion. The differential response to appetizing and unappetizing foods suggest that the body uses disgust as a cue to whether a food is good to eat and responds accordingly.

Another emotion with a bodily effect that can be measured by EGG is that of stress. When the body is stressed and engages in the fight-or-flight response, blood flow is directed to the muscles in the arms and legs and away from the digestive system. This loss of blood flow slows the digestive system, and this slowing can be seen on the EGG. However, this response can vary from person to person and situation to situation.

All of these examples are part of a larger theory of a brain–gut connection. This theory states that the vagus nerve provides a direct link between the brain and the gut so that emotions can affect stomach rhythms and vice versa. This idea originated in the mid-1800s when Alexis St. Martin, a man with a gunshot-induced fistula in his abdomen, experienced lower secretions of digestive juices and a slower stomach emptying when he was upset. In this case, the emotions St. Martin was feeling affected his physiological reaction, but the reverse can also be true. In a study with Crohn's disease patients where patients and unaffected controls watched happy, frightening, disgusting, and saddening films, patients with active Crohn's disease had more responsive EGG (a greater physiological response) and reported feeling more aroused when feeling the negative emotions of disgust or sadness. This leads researchers to believe that increased physiological activation can influence increased experience of emotions. Another study published in 1943 that studied the fistulated man Tom discovered that if "Tom was fearful or depressed his gastic activity decreased but when he was angry or hostile his gastric activity increased". This finding is contrasted by an EGG study by Ercolani et al. who had subjects perform either difficult or easy mental arithmetic or puzzles. They found that new tasks slowed down the myoelectrical activity of the stomach, suggesting that stress tends to impede gastric activity and that this can be picked up on an EGG. While there is still much research to be done on the brain-gut connection, research thus far has indeed shown that your stomach does indeed churn differently when you are emotionally aroused, and this could be the basis of the gut feeling that many people describe experiencing.

=== Gender differences ===
In recent years, some research has been done about gender differences in the perception and experience of disgust. One such study, upon presenting both male and female subjects with video clips designed to trigger disgust and found that although women reported feeling more disgust than men at these stimuli, the physiological responses did not show much difference. This could mean that, psychologically, women are more sensitive to disgust than men; however this assertion cannot be supported with physiological data. More research has to be done in this area to see if there are gender differences in the psychophysiological experience of disgust.

== Unsolved problems ==
There are some limitations to the use of electrogastroenterography:

- the absence of a standard technique of performance peripheral electrogastroenterography,
- the absence of standard norms of electrophysiological parameters of bioelectric activity in the GT tract,
- the impossibility of an estimation of change of motility abnormalities during the concrete moments of time on local sites of GI tract.

== Other advances ==
- 24-hour electrogastrography and electrogastroenterography.
- The joint electrogastroenterography with 24-hour esophageal pH monitoring.
- Wavelet analysis of electrogastroenterogram.
- Telemetry capsule for the EGG monitoring in a stomach and an intestines.

== Clinical applications ==
Electrogastrography or gastroenterography is used when a patient is suspected of having a motility disorder, which can be indicated by recurrent nausea and vomiting, signs that the stomach is not emptying food normally. The clinical use of electrogastrography has been most widely evaluated in patients with gastroparesis and functional dyspepsia.

== Sources ==
- Stern, Robert Mitchell; Koch, Kenneth (2004). Handbook of electrogastrography. Oxford [Oxfordshire]: Oxford University Press. ISBN 978-0-19-514788-9.
- Mintchev M. Selected Topics on Electrogastrography: Electrical phenomena in the human stomach.
- Kosenko P.M.; Vavrinchuk S.A. (2013). Electrogastroenterography in patients with complicated peptic ulcer disease (PDF). Yelm, WA, USA: Science Book Publishing House. p. 142. ISBN 978-1-62174-026-1.
