= Migrating motor complex =

Physiological phenomenon

Migrating motor complex, also known as migrating myoelectric complex, migratory motor complex, migratory myoelectric complex and MMC, is a cyclic, recurring motility pattern that occurs in the stomach and small bowel during fasting; it is interrupted by feeding. A pattern of electrical activity is also observed in the gastrointestinal tract in a regular cycle during this interdigestive period.

MMC was discovered and characterized in fasting dogs in 1969 by Joseph H. Szurszewski at the Mayo Clinic. He also showed that this activity stops upon eating a meal, and suggested that it induces a motor activity that acts as an "interdigestive housekeeper" in the small intestine. These motor complexes trigger peristaltic waves, which facilitate transportation of indigestible substances such as bone, fiber, and foreign bodies from the stomach, through the small intestine, past the ileocecal sphincter, and into the colon. MMC activity varies widely across individuals and within an individual when measured on different days. The MMC occurs every 90–230 minutes during the interdigestive phase (i.e., between meals) and is responsible for the rumbling experienced when hungry. It also serves to transport bacteria from the small intestine to the large intestine and to inhibit the migration of colonic bacteria into the terminal ileum; an impairment to the MMC typically results in small intestinal bacterial overgrowth.

== Phases ==
The MMC originates mostly in the stomach—although ~25% will arise from the duodenum or proximal jejunum—and can travel to the distal end of the ileum. They consist of four distinct phases:

- Phase I – A prolonged period of quiescence (40–60% of total time);
- Phase II – Increased frequency of action potentials and smooth muscle contractility (20–30% of total time);
- Phase III – A few minutes of peak electrical and mechanical activity (5–10 minutes);
- Phase IV – Declining activity which merges with the next Phase I.

== Regulation ==
Movements of the small bowel are believed to be controlled by the central and enteric nervous systems, intestinal muscles, and numerous peptides and hormones. For example, the MMC is thought to be initiated by motilin, and it does not directly depend on extrinsic nerves. Additionally, gastrin, insulin, cholecystokinin, glucagon, and secretin have been reported to disrupt the MMC.

Eating interrupts the MMC. For example, one study found that a continental breakfast of 450 Kcal causes the MMC to disappear for 213 ± 48 minutes. The number of calories and nature of food determine the length of the disruption with fats causing a longer disruption than carbohydrates which in turn cause a longer disruption than protein.

Most of the cleaning waves in the MMC happen at night while we are asleep. For many people this will be sufficient to help maintain a healthy, balanced environment in the digestive tract. For others, it may be beneficial to space out food intake to allow for a couple of cleaning waves to occur between meals throughout the day as well.

== Impairment ==
Autoimmunity following infection by a pathogen producing CdtB, such as C. jejuni, may be the leading cause of MMC impairment. Narcotics are also known to impair the MMC. Stress has been shown to reduce MMC activity as well.

Patients with SIBO and IBS have on average a third as many MMC phase III events with those events being roughly 30% shorter on average.

== Therapeutic stimuli ==
Drugs used to enhance gastrointestinal motility are generally referred to as prokinetics. Serotonin induces phase III of the MMC, and so serotonin receptor agonists are commonly administered as prokinetics. Motilin administration causes phase III contractions, and so motilin agonists are another common prokinetic.

Eradication of bacterial overgrowth has been shown to partially restore MMC activity.

An elemental diet has been hypothesized to partially restore MMC function.
