= C16H22ClN3O2 =

The molecular formula C_{16}H_{22}ClN_{3}O_{2} (molar mass: 323.82 g/mol, exact mass: 323.1401 u) may refer to:

- Renzapride
