= Intestinal methanogen overgrowth =

Medical condition

Intestinal methanogen overgrowth (IMO) is a condition where methanogens overgrow in the gastrointestinal tract, producing an excess of methane gas.

== Definition ==
The disorder is distinct from small intestinal bacterial overgrowth (SIBO). IMO is an overgrowth of archaea, such as Methanobrevibacter smithii, rather than bacteria; it is not exclusive to the small intestine, and can occur in the colon as well.

== Signs and symptoms ==
Intestinal methanogen overgrowth can cause constipation due to the inhibition of peristalsis by methane. Bloating is a common symptom.

== Diagnosis ==
Diagnosis is by methane breath testing, similar to SIBO.

== Treatment ==
As IMO is caused by an overgrowth of archaea, symptoms can be treated with specific antibiotics, such as neomycin or metronidazole. In cases of comorbidity with SIBO, an adjunct treatment with rifaximin is effective in many cases. There is evidence that Limosilactobacillus reuteri DSM 17938 can reduce intestinal methane production and accelerate colonic transit in patients with IMO.

== See also ==
- Small intestinal bacterial overgrowth
- Dysbiosis
