= Hydrogen breath test =

Medical diagnostic test

- Purpose: diagnostic tool for carbohydrate malabsorption and small intestine bacterial overgrowth

A hydrogen breath test (HBT) or hydrogen-methane breath test is a breath test used as a diagnostic tool for small intestine bacterial overgrowth (SIBO), intestinal methanogen overgrowth (IMO), and carbohydrate malabsorption, such as lactose, fructose, and sorbitol malabsorption.

The test is a simple, non-invasive procedure, and is performed after a short period of fasting (typically 8–12 hours). Hydrogen breath tests are based on the fact that there is no source for hydrogen gas in humans other than bacterial metabolism of carbohydrates. The test is normally known as a hydrogen breath test, but often includes testing for methane. Many studies have shown that some people (approximately 35% or more) do not produce hydrogen but actually produce methane, and sometimes a combination of the two gases is found. Other people, who are known as "non-responders", don't produce any gas; it has not yet been determined whether they may actually produce another gas. In addition to hydrogen and methane, some facilities also utilize carbon dioxide (CO_{2}) in the patient's breath to determine if the breath samples that are being analyzed are contaminated (either with room air or bronchial dead space air).

Physicians have expressed concern at the improper use and widespread overdiagnoses related to interpretation of these tests.

== Conditions ==
Tests vary from country to country, so the following information is provided as a rough guide to typical uses of the hydrogen breath test:

Fructose malabsorption – the patient takes a base reading of hydrogen levels in their breath. The patient is then given 25-35g of fructose, and then required to take readings every 15, 30 or 60 minutes for three - five hours. The basis of the test is a failure to absorb the given sugar, which is then metabolized by bacteria that give off either hydrogen or methane. Therefore, the more gas that is produced, the less absorption has occurred. If the level of hydrogen rises above 20 ppm (parts per million) over the lowest preceding value within the test period, the patient is typically diagnosed as a fructose malabsorber. If the patient produces methane then the parts per million for the methane typically rises 12 ppm over the lowest preceding value to be considered positive. If the patient produces both hydrogen and methane then the values are typically added together and the mean of the numbers is used to determine positive results, usually 15 ppm over the lowest preceding value. A positive result may also be caused by small intestinal bacterial overgrowth, rather than fructose malabsorption.

Lactose malabsorption – the patient takes a base reading of hydrogen levels in their breath. The patient is then given a small amount of pure lactose (typically 20 to 25 g), and then required to take readings every 15, 30 or 60 minutes for two to three hours. If the level of hydrogen rises above 20 ppm (parts per million) over the lowest preceding value within the test period, the patient is typically diagnosed as a lactose malabsorber. If the patient produces methane then the parts per million for the methane typically rises 12 ppm over the lowest preceding value to be considered positive. If the patient produces both hydrogen and methane then the values are typically added together and the mean of the numbers is used to determine positive results, usually 15 ppm over the lowest preceding value. A positive result may also be caused by small intestinal bacterial overgrowth, rather than lactose malabsorption.

Small intestinal bacterial overgrowth (SIBO) – the patient is either given a challenge dose of glucose, also known as dextrose (75–100 grams), or lactulose (10 grams). A baseline breath sample is collected, and then additional samples are collected at 15 minute or 20 minute intervals for 2 hours. Positive diagnosis for a lactulose SIBO breath test – typically positive if the patient produces approximately 20 ppm of hydrogen and/or methane within the first 60–90 minutes (indicates bacteria in the small intestine), followed by a much larger peak (colonic response). This is also known as a biphasic pattern. Lactulose is not absorbed by the digestive system and can help determine distal end bacterial overgrowth, which means the bacteria are lower in the small intestine.

=== Alternative test methods ===
The idea that a SIBO test should be several hours long and that distal overgrowth is important is not supported by the scientific literature. The optimal testing is 1 hour. Small intestinal bacterial overgrowth (SIBO) occurs as a result of excessive numbers of bacteria inhabiting the proximal small intestine. Bacterial concentrations greater than 10^{5} organisms per milliliter is diagnostic for SIBO. We know bacteria are colonizing the proximal and not the distal small intestine for several reasons. First, the gold standard method for detection of SIBO is jejunal aspirates. Intestinal fluid of the proximal intestine is sampled, not distal intestinal fluid. Secondly, the consequences of SIBO are the result of competition between bacteria and the human host for ingested nutrients in the intestine. Various functional consequences of bacterial infiltration cause enterocyte damage in the jejunum such as diminished disaccharidase activity, fat malabsorption, decreased amino acid transport and decreased vitamin B_{12} absorption. Thus, detection of proximal bacterial overgrowth is critical.

The SIBO breath test typically uses a 10 gram oral dose of lactulose for detection of proximal bacterial overgrowth. The best practice is to have breath samples collected at 20, 40, and 60 minutes after dosing. Since SIBO occurs in the proximal intestine, breath samples should be collected only within 1 hour after lactulose ingestion. This truly reflects proximal intestinal bacterial activity, not distal or colonic activity. The same argument is true if glucose is the substrate.

Lactulose is a carbohydrate that is not absorbed by humans. Lactulose is well known to measure oro-cecal transit time. The mean oro-cecal transit time in normal healthy individuals is 70 to 90 minutes. By 90 minutes, at least 50% of individuals would have delivered the lactulose dose to the colon. Approximately 90 to 95% of individuals have colonic bacteria that can metabolize lactulose to hydrogen or methane gas. Thus, any SIBO breath test that collects longer than 60 minutes may be measuring colonic activity. Diagnostic criteria of 20 ppm hydrogen and/or methane changes within 90 or 120 minutes will have higher positive rates of SIBO but this will reflect colonic activity not jejunal metabolism. A one-hour SIBO breath test avoids false positive results by collecting breath up to 60 minutes.

Positive diagnosis for a glucose SIBO breath test – glucose is absorbed by the digestive system so studies have shown it to be harder to diagnose distal end bacterial overgrowth since the glucose typically doesn't reach the colon before being absorbed. An increase of approximately 12 ppm or more in hydrogen and/or methane during the breath test could conclude bacterial overgrowth. Recent study indicates "The role of testing for SIBO in individuals with suspected IBS remains unclear."

The excess hydrogen or methane is assumed to be typically caused by an overgrowth of otherwise normal intestinal bacteria.

Other breath tests that can be taken include: sucrose intolerance, d-xylose and sorbitol.
