= D-xylose absorption test =

- Purpose: malabsorption of small intestine test

D-xylose absorption test is a medical test performed to diagnose conditions that present with malabsorption of the proximal small intestine due to defects in the integrity of the gastrointestinal mucosa. D-xylose is a monosaccharide, or simple sugar, that does not require enzymes for digestion prior to absorption. Its absorption requires an intact mucosa only. In contrast, polysaccharides require enzymes, such as amylase, to break them down so that they can eventually be absorbed as monosaccharides. This test was previously in use but has been made redundant by antibody tests.

In normal individuals, a 25 g oral dose of D-xylose will be absorbed and excreted in the urine at approximately 4.5 g in 5 hours. A decreased urinary excretion of D-xylose is seen in conditions involving the gastrointestinal mucosa, such as small intestinal bacterial overgrowth and Whipple's disease. In cases of bacterial overgrowth, the values of D-xylose absorption return to normal after treatment with antibiotics. In contrast, if the D-xylose urinary excretion is not normal after a course of antibiotics, then the problem must be due to a non-infectious cause of malabsorption (i.e., celiac disease).
