= Camicinal =

Chemical compound

Clinical data
- Other names: GSK962040

Identifiers
- IUPAC name: 1-{4-[(3-Fluorophenyl)amino]-1-piperidinyl}-2-(4-{[(3S)-3-methyl-1-piperazinyl]methyl}phenyl)ethanone
- CAS Number: 923565-21-3
- PubChem CID: 15984937
- ChemSpider: 13116304
- UNII: 3C8348951H
- KEGG: D10330
- CompTox Dashboard (EPA): DTXSID901025606
- ECHA InfoCard: 100.158.139

Chemical and physical data
- Formula: C_{25}H_{33}FN_{4}O
- Molar mass: 424.564 g·mol^{−1}
- 3D model (JSmol): Interactive image
- SMILES: C[C@H]1CN(CCN1)CC2=CC=C(C=C2)CC(=O)N3CCC(CC3)NC4=CC(=CC=C4)F
- InChI: InChI=1S/C25H33FN4O/c1-19-17-29(14-11-27-19)18-21-7-5-20(6-8-21)15-25(31)30-12-9-23(10-13-30)28-24-4-2-3-22(26)16-24/h2-8,16,19,23,27-28H,9-15,17-18H2,1H3/t19-/m0/s1; Key:RZKDEGZIFSJVNA-IBGZPJMESA-N

Camicinal was a motilin agonist investigated for the treatment of gastroparesis. It did not improve enteral feeding intolerance.
