= Acotiamide =

Chemical compound

Clinical data
- Trade names: Acofide, others
- Other names: YM-443, Z-338
- Routes of administration: By mouth
- ATC code: A03FA10 (WHO) QA03FA10 (WHO)

Legal status
- Legal status: JP: Rx-only

Pharmacokinetic data
- Protein binding: 84.21–85.95%
- Metabolism: UGT1A8 and 1A9 (major)
- Elimination half-life: 10.9–21.7 hours
- Excretion: Feces (92.7%), urine (5.3%)

Identifiers
- IUPAC name: N-{2-[bis(1-Methylethyl)amino]ethyl}-2-{[(2-hydroxy-4,5-dimethoxyphenyl)carbonyl]amino}-1,3-thiazole-4-carboxamide
- CAS Number: 185106-16-5
- PubChem CID: 5282338
- ChemSpider: 4445505
- UNII: D42OWK5383
- KEGG: D08838
- ChEMBL: ChEMBL2107723
- CompTox Dashboard (EPA): DTXSID40870163

Chemical and physical data
- Formula: C_{21}H_{30}N_{4}O_{5}S
- Molar mass: 450.55 g·mol^{−1}
- 3D model (JSmol): Interactive image
- SMILES: O=C(Nc1nc(C(=O)NCCN(C(C)C)C(C)C)cs1)c2cc(OC)c(OC)cc2O
- InChI: InChI=1S/C21H30N4O5S/c1-12(2)25(13(3)4)8-7-22-20(28)15-11-31-21(23-15)24-19(27)14-9-17(29-5)18(30-6)10-16(14)26/h9-13,26H,7-8H2,1-6H3,(H,22,28)(H,23,24,27); Key:TWHZNAUBXFZMCA-UHFFFAOYSA-N

Acotiamide, sold under the brand names Acofide, and Dyspevict is a medication manufactured and approved in Japan and Russia for the treatment of postprandial fullness, upper abdominal bloating, and early satiation due to functional dyspepsia. It acts as an acetylcholinesterase inhibitor.
