= Jejunal arteries =

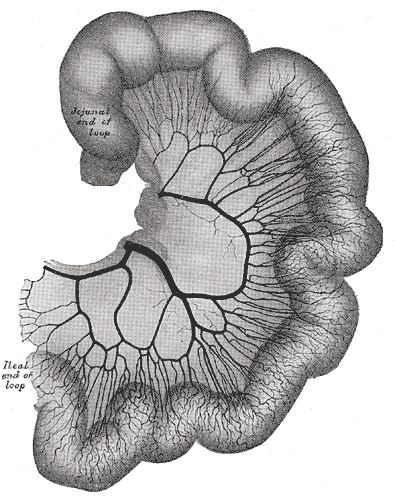
- Loop of small intestine showing distribution of intestinal arteries.

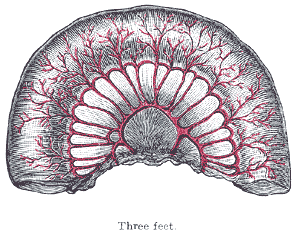
- Jejunal arteries

Details
- Source: Superior mesenteric artery
- Vein: Jejunal veins
- Supplies: Jejunum

Identifiers
- Latin: arteriae jejunales
- TA98: A12.2.12.057
- TA2: 4256
- FMA: 70809

The jejunal arteries are four-five branches of the superior mesenteric artery which supply blood to the jejunum. They arise from the left side of the superior mesenteric artery.
