= Motilin receptor =

Protein-coding gene in the species Homo sapiens

MLNR

Identifiers
- Aliases: MLNR, GPR38, MTLR1, motilin receptor
- External IDs: OMIM: 602885; GeneCards: MLNR

Gene location (Human)
Chr.	Chromosome 13 (human)
Band	13q14.2	Start	49,220,338 bp
Band	13q14.2	End	49,222,377 bp
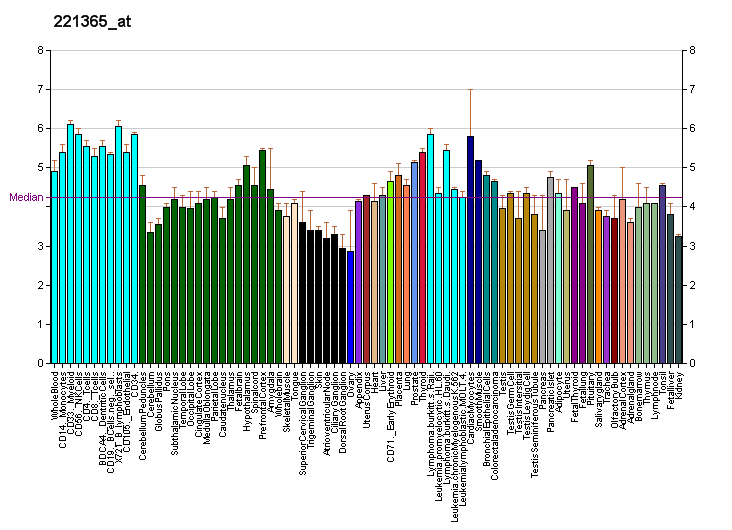
RNA expression pattern
Bgee	Human / Mouse (ortholog); Top expressed in: testicle; gonad; bone marrow; fundus; body of stomach; islet of Langerhans; blood; stromal cell of endometrium; right lobe of thyroid gland; kidney / n/a; More reference expression data
BioGPS	More reference expression data
Gene ontology
Molecular function	growth hormone-releasing hormone receptor activity; signal transducer activity; G protein-coupled receptor activity; G protein-coupled peptide receptor activity; hormone binding
Cellular component	integral component of membrane; plasma membrane; membrane
Biological process	G protein-coupled receptor signaling pathway; signal transduction
Sources:Amigo / QuickGO
Orthologs
Databases	NCBI: entry; OMA: entry
Species	Human	Mouse
Entrez	2862	n/a
Ensembl	ENSG00000102539	n/a
UniProt	O43193	n/a
RefSeq (mRNA)	NM_001507	n/a
RefSeq (protein)	NP_001498	n/a
Location (UCSC)	Chr 13: 49.22 – 49.22 Mb	n/a
PubMed search		n/a
- Wikidata
View/Edit Human

Motilin receptor is a G protein-coupled receptor (previously GPCR38) that binds motilin. It was first cloned in 1999 by Merck Laboratories. and scientists have since been searching for compounds to modify its behavior.

The primary structure of the motilin receptor consists of 412 amino acids, while its tertiary structure resembles a golf club. The protein C-terminal protein protects from enzymatic degradation, while the N-terminal is essential for binding.

== Function ==
The primary function of the motilin receptor is to contract gastric smooth muscle during phase III of the migrating motor complex (MMC). In this final phase of the MMC, N-type motilin receptors in the distal antral pump of the stomach are activated. This causes contraction of the gastric smooth muscle, sieving food into the small intestine, and priming the stomach for the next meal.

== Motilin ==
Motilin is an intestinal peptide that stimulates the contraction of gastric smooth muscle via the motilin receptor. It is produced by enteroendocrine cells in the proximal small intestine and secreted cyclically. Motilin mimetics could be used to increase gastric motility in patients with gastroparesis e.g., constipation-predominant irritable bowel syndrome. However, none of the candidate drugs that have been tested so far have made it to market.
