= Stomach rumble =

Noise produced by gastrointestinal system

- Other names: borborygmus
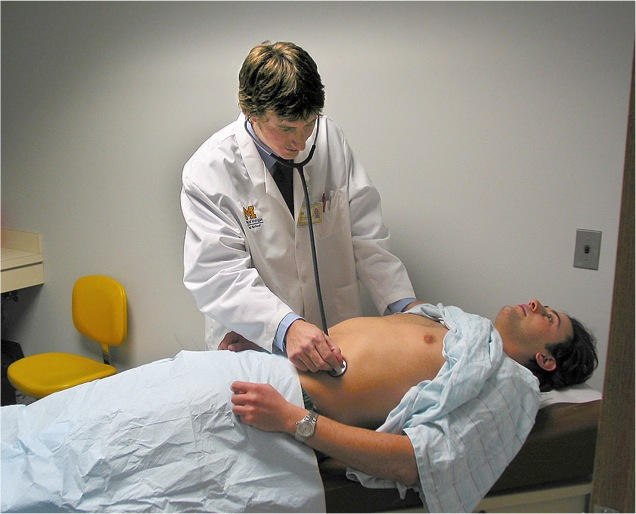
- A doctor listening to a patient's bowel sounds using a stethoscope applied to the patient's abdomen
- Specialty: Gastroenterology

Stomach rumble
Recording of a stomach rumble (borborygmus)

A stomach rumble, also known as a bowel sound, peristaltic sound, abdominal sound, bubble gut or borborygmus (pronounced /ˌbɔːrbəˈrɪɡməs/; plural borborygmi), is a rumbling, growling or gurgling noise produced by movement of the contents of the gastrointestinal tract as they are propelled through the small intestine by a series of muscle contractions called peristalsis. A trained healthcare provider can listen to these intestinal noises with a stethoscope, but they may be audible enough to be heard with the naked ear as the fluid and gas move forward in the intestines (in the vicinity of, but not actually within the stomach). The lack of bowel sounds can occur with ileus, intestinal obstruction, or other pathologies, but there is no evidence that listening for their absence is useful for diagnosis.

== Etymology ==
The scientific name borborygmus is related to the 16th-century French word borborygme, itself from Latin, ultimately from Ancient Greek βορβορυγμός (borborygmós). The Greek term is probably onomatopoetic in origin.

== Other causes ==
Other causes of stomach rumbles:

- Incomplete digestion of food can lead to excess gas in the intestine. In humans, this can be due to incomplete digestion of carbohydrate-containing foods, including milk and other dairy products (lactose intolerance or the use of α-glucosidase inhibitors by diabetics), gluten (protein in wheat, barley, and rye) (coeliac disease), fruit, vegetables, beans, legumes, and high-fiber whole grains. In rare instances, excessive abdominal noise may be a sign of digestive disease, especially when accompanied by abdominal bloating, abdominal pain, diarrhea or constipation. Some examples of diseases that may be associated with this symptom include carcinoid neoplasm and coeliac sprue.
- Louder rumbles may occur when the individual is hungry. The sound of air moving around the lumen of the stomach is amplified by the empty space. Around two hours after the stomach has been emptied, it sends signals to the brain, which tells the digestive muscles to restart peristalsis in a wave called the migrating motor complex. Food left behind after the first cycle is swept up, and the vibrations of the empty stomach - accompanied by the 'hunger hormone' ghrelin, which is also produced by the stomach when it is empty - produce the physical sensation of hunger. Appetite also plays a big role in this situation. Peristalsis recurs about every hour, and one's appetite may cause 10- to 20-minute food cravings.
- Stomach rumbles can form further along the gastrointestinal system when air is swallowed while talking, eating, and drinking. This phenomenon occurs in most people and is typical. Stomach rumbles may also occur due to carbon dioxide moving through the stomach and intestines following the consumption of carbonated drinks.

== Diseases and conditions ==
- Celiac disease is a condition that prevents the small intestine from absorbing parts of food that are needed to stay healthy. Consuming food containing gluten is dangerous for people with this disease: Intestinal villi help to absorb nutrients from food, but when gluten is consumed, the immune system attacks these villi as a result. Symptoms may include abdominal pain, nausea, and bulky or foul smelling stools.
- Colitis is swelling of the large intestine. The many different forms of colitis include cytomegalovirus or Cryptosporidium infection, and necrotizing and pseudomembranous colitis. The usual causes of colitis are infection and lack of blood flow. Symptoms may include bloody stools, chills, dehydration, diarrhea, and fever.
- Diverticulitis is a condition where small bulging sacs, usually found in the large intestine, become inflamed or infected. The most probable cause is a low-fiber diet. About half the American population over the age of 60 have diverticulosis, which is the presence of such sacs that may become infected. Symptoms may include bloating, fever, and nausea.
- Irritable bowel syndrome, a disorder in the lower intestinal tract, is usually accompanied by other symptoms, such as abdominal pain and diarrhea. It is more common in women and it usually occurs during early adulthood. There are many risk factors such as emotional stress and a low-fiber diet. These can all cause stomach disorders.

Diseases/conditions	Possible Prescribed Treatments
Celiac disease	Lifelong gluten-free diet, avoid anything containing wheat, barley, rye, and possibly oats
Colitis	If caused by inflammation, it is treated with medicine. If caused by infection, it is treated with an antiprotozoal agent. If caused by lack of blood flow, it is treated with a liquid diet and antibiotics.
Diverticulitis	If symptoms are minimal, treat by: Getting plenty of rest.; Using a heat pad while sleeping.; Taking pain medication.; Drinking only liquids for a few days, then build up slowly with harder liquid, and eventually solid food.; Avoid foods such as beans and peas along with coarse grains and dried fruits. Limiting consumption of coffee, tea, and alcohol is recommended.
Irritable bowel syndrome (IBS)	Regular exercise and improved sleep habits can help relieve symptoms. Although IBS differs from person to person, dieting helps.: Avoid foods and drinks that contain caffeine.; Avoid large meals.; Increase the consumption of fiber throughout the day (helps constipation, but bloating may be an issue).

== Nonmedical usage ==
The word borborygmic has been used in literature to describe noisy plumbing. In Ada, Vladimir Nabokov wrote: "All the toilets and waterpipes in the house had been suddenly seized with borborygmic convulsions". In A Long Way Down (New York: Harper, 1959, p. 54), Elizabeth Fenwick wrote: "The room was very quiet, except for its borborygmic old radiator". Graham Greene's short story "Alas, Poor Maling" tells the tale of a luckless individual whose borborygmus takes the form of irritating noises that he has recently heard.

The word borborygmus has also been used in journalism to describe political turbulence. In an article in The Atlantic, Graeme Wood used the word to describe the effects of mass refugee migration into Europe: "Central Europe had to digest a massive refugee flow from Syria and Afghanistan, and the resulting borborygmus upended European politics and enabled a populist wave that has yet to crest."

== See also ==
- Flatulence
- Ileus
- Migrating motor complex
