= Jejunal veins =

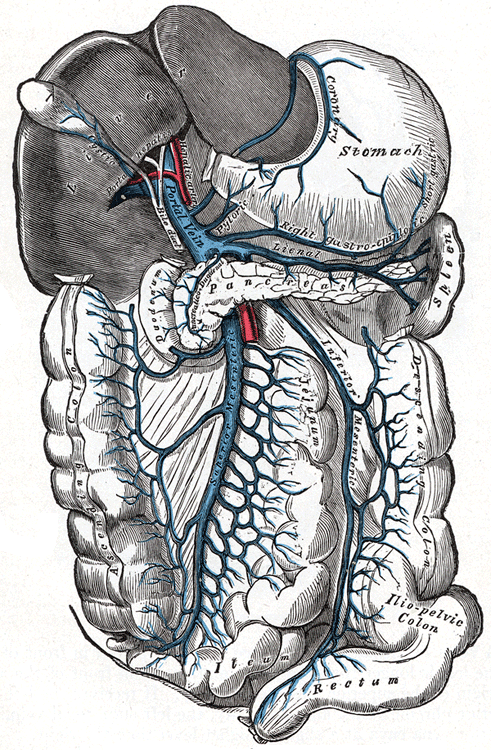
- The portal vein and its tributaries.

Details
- Drains from: Jejunum
- Drains to: Superior mesenteric vein
- Artery: Jejunal arteries

Identifiers
- Latin: venae jejunales
- TA98: A12.3.12.019
- TA2: 5114
- FMA: 70927

The jejunal veins drains the jejunum and are tributaries of the superior mesenteric vein.
