= Cinitapride =

Chemical compound

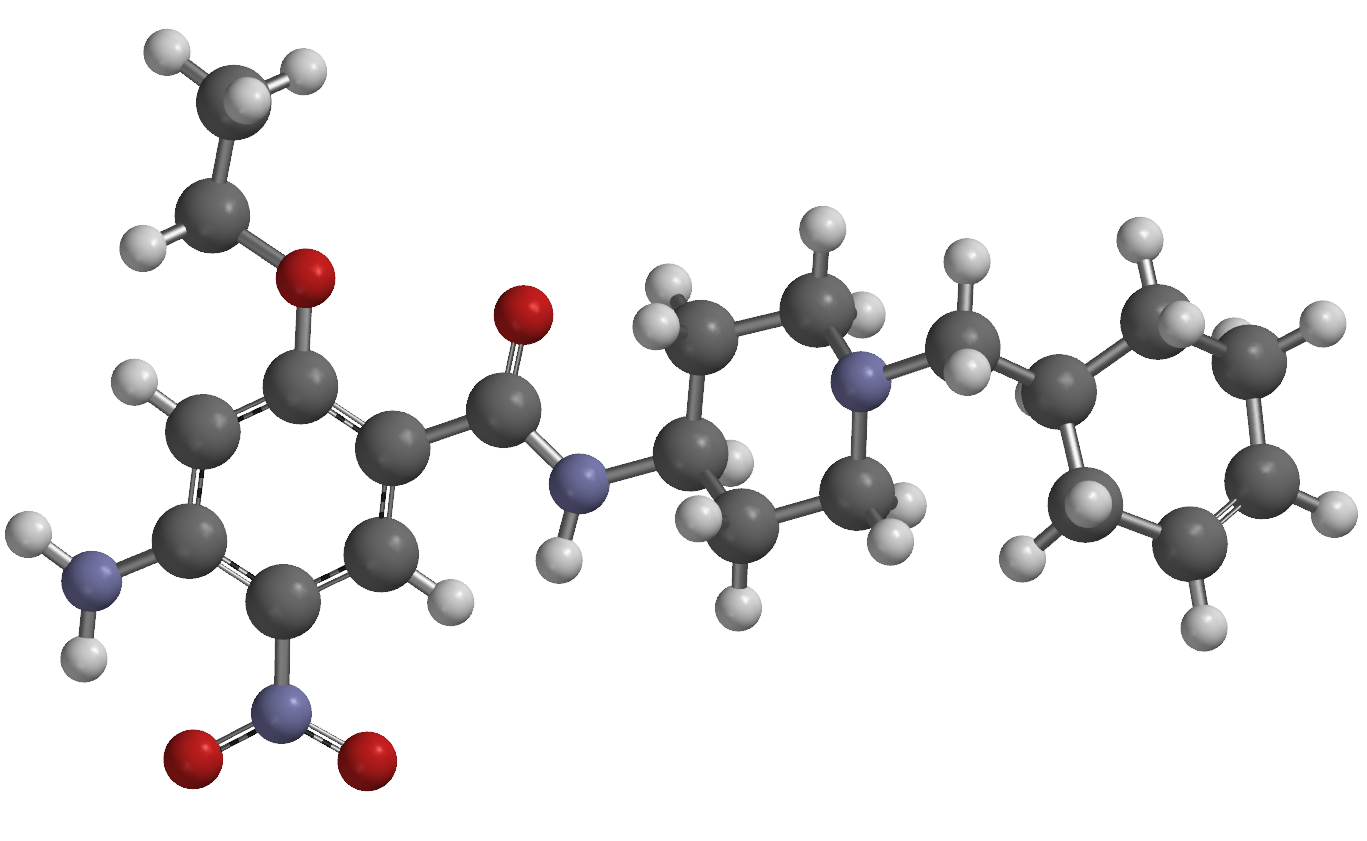

Clinical data
- Trade names: Cintapro, Pemix, Gapulsid, Cidine
- Routes of administration: Oral
- ATC code: A03FA08 (WHO)

Legal status
- Legal status: In general: ℞ (Prescription only)

Identifiers
- IUPAC name: 4-amino-N-[1-(cyclohex-3-en-1-ylmethyl)piperidin-4-yl]-2-ethoxy-5-nitrobenzamide
- CAS Number: 66564-14-5
- PubChem CID: 68867
- DrugBank: DB08810
- ChemSpider: 62099
- UNII: R8I97I2L24
- KEGG: D07700
- ChEMBL: ChEMBL2104523
- CompTox Dashboard (EPA): DTXSID60867232

Chemical and physical data
- Formula: C_{21}H_{30}N_{4}O_{4}
- Molar mass: 402.495 g·mol^{−1}
- Chirality: Racemic mixture
- InChI: InChI=1S/C21H30N4O4/c1-2-29-20-13-18(22)19(25(27)28)12-17(20)21(26)23-16-8-10-24(11-9-16)14-15-6-4-3-5-7-15/h3-4,12-13,15-16H,2,5-11,14,22H2,1H3,(H,23,26); Key:ZDLBNXXKDMLZMF-UHFFFAOYSA-N

Cinitapride (trade names Cintapro, Pemix, Gapulsid, Cidine) is a gastroprokinetic agent and antiemetic agent of the benzamide class which is marketed in India, Mexico, Pakistan, Spain, Croatia and the Czech Republic. It acts as an agonist of the 5-HT_{1} and 5-HT_{4} receptors and as an antagonist of the 5-HT_{2} receptors.

== Uses ==
It is indicated for the treatment of gastrointestinal disorders associated with motility disturbances such as gastroesophageal reflux disease, non-ulcer dyspepsia and delayed gastric emptying. It may be also used in the management of nausea and vomiting. Cinitapride works by increasing the movement of esophagus, stomach, and intestines during digestion. It also increases the strength of muscle between esophagus and stomach to prevent reflux conditions.

== Synthesis ==

Cinitapride is the amide formed by reacting methyl 4-amino-2-ethoxy-5-nitrobenzoate (1) with the 4-aminopiperidine derivative (2).
