= Elemental diet =

Liquid diet that is easy to digest

An elemental diet (also termed elemental nutrition) is a diet of liquid nutrients which is easy to digest and provides complete nutritional requirements. Elemental diet formulas are usually composed of amino acids, fats, sugars, vitamins, and minerals. The diet does not contain whole or partial proteins, food additives, or other common allergens. The diet can be administered orally, via a gastric feeding tube, or via intravenous feeding.

== Description ==
Elemental diet formulas are variable, but usually consist of a liquid mixture of:

- Free amino acids: both essential amino acids and non-essential amino acids.
- Lipids: medium-chain triglycerides, sometimes with long-chain triglycerides.
- Carbohydrates: simple sugars (glucose or maltose) or polysaccharides (e.g., maltodextrin) that are easy to digest.
- Water-soluble vitamins and fat-soluble vitamins.
- Electrolytes.

Significant features of the elemental diet are:

- Hypoallergenic: low potential for allergic reaction since there are no whole proteins, food additives, or other common allergens. However, allergic reaction is rarely possible.
- Easy to digest: the liquid diet contains ingredients which require minimal processing by digestive enzymes and may be absorbed efficiently without active digestion. This causes less stimulation of the pancreas and the gall bladder.
- Anti-inflammatory.
- Generates less feces compared to regular (solid) diets. The liquid is mostly absorbed in the first part of the small intestine.
- Low fat content.
- Provides complete requirements for micronutrients and macronutrients.
- Modulates microbiome: since the elemental diet contains no complex carbohydrates (such as fiber or resistant starch) which survive digestion in the small intestine, there is no fermentable food source for bacteria in the large intestine.
- Promotes healing of the mucosa (the lining of the gut) by allowing the gut to rest.

When testing for SIBO, the elemental diet may consist only of nutrients that will be absorbed by the proximal small bowel.

== Uses ==
An elemental diet is sometimes used for a range of gastrointestinal and systemic diseases, especially those involving atopy, inflammation, indigestion, and malabsorption. The diet is sometimes used in the following medical situations (with varying degrees of evidence):

- Severe diarrhea (e.g., bile acid diarrhea)
- High output ostomy
- Gastrointestinal fistula
- Eosinophilic esophagitis
- Eosinophilic gastroenteritis
- Inflammatory bowel disease (e.g., Crohn's disease, ulcerative colitis)
- Celiac disease
- Dermatitis herpetiformis
- Food intolerance
- Food allergy
- Pancreatitis
- Oral mucositis caused by chemotherapy or radiotherapy
- Short gut syndrome
- Small intestinal bacterial overgrowth (SIBO) and intestinal methanogen overgrowth
- Irritable bowel syndrome
- Severe asthma
- Severe eczema
- Rheumatoid arthritis
- Intestinal lymphangiectasia
- Cronkhite–Canada syndrome
- Orofacial granulomatosis
- Chylothorax
- Chylous ascites
- To reduce gastrointestinal bleeding in burn injury
- After certain surgical procedures; e.g., gastrectomy, colectomy, pancreatectomy, and duodenectomy

== Adverse effects ==
Many people are unable to tolerate the taste, even if the diet is flavored, and choose to receive it through intragastric administration. In one study, 36% of children could not tolerate the diet. In another, 41% of adults could not tolerate it. The elemental diet is also expensive. Since it prevents people from eating any normal food, it can have psychological effects and be socially limiting.

Possible nausea and diarrhea can result from the high sugar content which can also complicate hyperglycaemia in people with pre-existing diabetes. The elemental diet is sometimes gradually started over a period of three days, successively increasing in strength on each day to reduce the likelihood of diarrhea and abdominal colic.

The elemental diet reduces gut motility and secretions from the stomach, pancreas, and gall bladder. These functions normally prevent significant bacterial colonization of the small intestine. Furthermore, long term absence of fermentable food source arriving for bacteria in the large intestine may also promote SIBO.

Experiments have shown that elemental formulas are a perfect growth medium for Clostridioides difficile.

It can be given orally or through a nasogastric tube if the person is not able to tolerate the liquid.

== Effectiveness ==
=== Small intestinal bacterial overgrowth (SIBO) and irritable bowel syndrome (IBS) ===
The elemental diet is an effective treatment for SIBO and intestinal methanogen overgrowth. The usefulness of the elemental diet for long term treatment of SIBO and IBS is unknown. After 14-21 days of elemental diet, people with IBS or SIBO experience a 66% reduction in symptoms. 85% of people with IBS or SIBO demonstrate normalization of lactulose hydrogen breath testing. Since the diet is restrictive, costly, and can taste unpleasant, it is most often prescribed to people who cannot tolerate antibiotics or those who have failed to respond to antibiotic treatment. Antibiotics remain the main treatment for SIBO, even though they are effective in less than 50% of cases.

=== Inflammatory bowel disease ===
An elemental diet is highly effective at inducing a remission period in both adults and children with Crohn's disease. The usefulness of the diet for maintaining remission in inflammatory bowel disease is unknown.

=== Celiac disease and dermatitis herpetiformis ===
There is limited evidence that an elemental diet may be useful for refractory celiac disease type 1 and dermatitis herpetiformis.

=== Eosinophilic esophagitis ===
The elemental diet produces histologic remission of eosinophilic esophagitis in over 90% of cases for both adults and children. However, despite the fact that the six food exclusion diet has a lower rate of histologic remission (72%), it is recommended instead of the elemental diet because it avoids the disadvantages of the latter.

=== Eosinophilic Gastritis/Gastroenteritis ===
The elemental diet is highly effective for eosinophilic gastritis/gastroenteritis. A partial elemental diet may be useful to stop recurrence of the condition, along with elimination diets or immunosuppressant medications.

=== Pouchitis ===
There is no good evidence that elemental diets are effective in treating chronic pouchitis.

=== Pancreatitis ===
As treatment for acute pancreatitis, there is no clear difference between elemental formulas and other enteral feeding formulas. In chronic pancreatitis, supplementation of the individual's diet with elemental formula may improve pain symptoms.

=== Mucositis and other side effects during chemotheraphy ===
Dietary measures such as an elemental diet may prevent chemotherapy-induced mucositis. This preventative effect may be more significant in gastroenterological cancer and esophageal cancer. However, another study reported that an elemental diet does not prevent oral mucositis or diarrhea in people with esophageal cancer. The elemental diet may prevent neutropenia and leucopenia in such people.

=== Bile acid diarrhea ===
Supplementation with elemental formula may have beneficial effects in secondary bile acid diarrhea (very low‐certainty evidence).

== See also ==
- Infant formula
- List of diets
- Meal replacement
- Medical food
- Low residue diet (low fiber diet)
