= Motilin =

Hormone found in humans

MLN
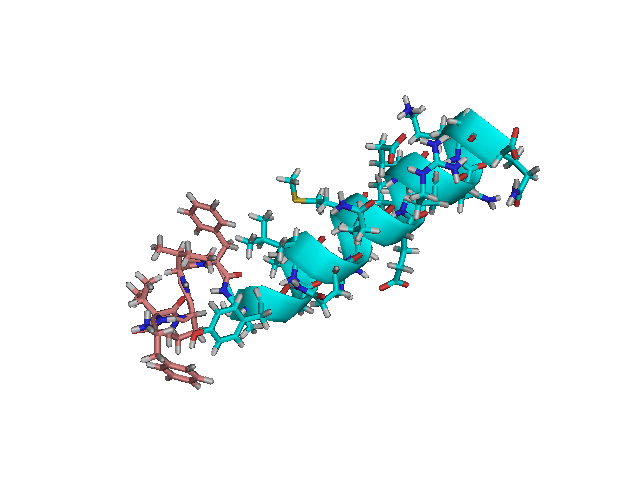
- NMR solution structure of motilin in phospholipid bicellar solution.

Identifiers
- Aliases: MLN, motilin
- External IDs: OMIM: 158270; GeneCards: MLN
Available structures
PDB	Human UniProt search: PDBe RCSB
PDB	List of PDB id codes 1LBJ

Gene location (Human)
Chr.	Chromosome 6 (human)
Band	6p21.31	Start	33,794,673 bp
Band	6p21.31	End	33,804,003 bp
RNA expression pattern
Bgee	Human / Mouse (ortholog); Top expressed in: duodenum; jejunal mucosa; gonad; skeletal muscle tissue; spinal cord; placenta; C1 segment; gastric mucosa; sensory nervous system; cervix / n/a; More reference expression data
BioGPS	n/a
Gene ontology
Molecular function	hormone activity; motilin receptor binding
Cellular component	extracellular region
Biological process	G protein-coupled receptor signaling pathway; regulation of signaling receptor activity; smooth muscle contraction
Sources:Amigo / QuickGO
Orthologs
Databases	NCBI: entry; OMA: entry
Species	Human	Mouse
Entrez	4295	n/a
Ensembl	ENSG00000096395	n/a
UniProt	P12872	n/a
RefSeq (mRNA)	NM_002418; NM_001040109; NM_001184698	n/a
RefSeq (protein)	NP_001035198; NP_001171627; NP_002409	n/a
Location (UCSC)	Chr 6: 33.79 – 33.8 Mb	n/a
PubMed search		n/a
- Wikidata
View/Edit Human

Motilin/ghrelin
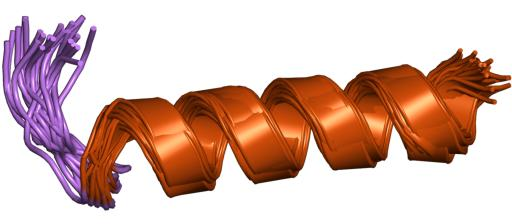
- Structure of motilin in isotropic phospholipid bicellar solution.

Identifiers
- Symbol: Motilin_ghrelin
- Pfam: PF04644
- InterPro: IPR006738
- SCOP2: 1lbj / SCOPe / SUPFAM
- OPM superfamily: 145
- OPM protein: 1lbj
Available protein structures:
- PDB: IPR006738 PF04644 (ECOD; PDBsum)
- AlphaFold: IPR006738; PF04644

Motilin is a 22-amino acid peptide hormone that in humans is encoded by the MLN gene.

Motilin is secreted by endocrine Mo cells (also referred to as M cells, which are not the same as the M cells, or microfold cells, found in Peyer's patches) that are numerous in crypts of the small intestine, especially in the duodenum and jejunum. It is released into the general circulation in humans at about 100-min intervals during the inter-digestive state and is the most important factor in controlling the inter-digestive migrating contractions; and it also stimulates endogenous release of the endocrine pancreas. Based on amino acid sequence, motilin is unrelated to other hormones. Because of its ability to stimulate gastric activity, it was named "motilin." Apart from in humans, the motilin receptor has been identified in the gastrointestinal tracts of pigs, rats, cows, and cats, and in the central nervous system of rabbits.

== Discovery ==
Motilin was discovered by J.C. Brown when he introduced alkaline solution into duodena of dogs, which caused strong gastric contractions. Brown et al. predicted that alkali could either release stimulus to activate motor activity or prevent the secretion of inhibitory hormone. They isolated a polypeptide as a by-product from purification of secretin on carboxymethyl cellulose. They named this polypeptide "Motilin."

== Structure ==
Motilin has 22 amino acids and molecular weight of 2698 daltons. In extract from human gut and plasma, there are two basic forms of motilin. The first molecular form is the polypeptide of 22 amino acids. The second form, on the other hand, is larger and contains the same 22 amino acids as the first form but includes an additional carboxyl-terminus end.

The sequences of amino acids of motilin is: Phe-Val-Pro-Ile-Phe-Thr-Tyr-Gly-Glu-Leu-Gln-Arg-Met-Gln-Glu-Lys-Glu-Arg-Asn-Lys-Gly-Gln.

The structure and dynamics of the gastrointestinal peptide hormone motilin have been studied in the presence of isotropic q = 0.5 phospholipid bicelles. The NMR solution structure of the peptide in acidic bicelle solution was determined from 203 NOE-derived distance constraints and six backbone torsion angle constraints. Dynamic properties for the ^{13}C_{α}→^{1}H vector in Leu-10 were determined for motilin specifically labeled with ^{13}C at this position by analysis of multiple-field relaxation data. The structure reveals an ordered alpha-helical conformation between Glu-9 and Lys-20. The N-terminus is also well structured with a turn resembling that of a classical beta-turn. The ^{13}C dynamics clearly show that motilin tumbles slowly in solution, with a correlation time characteristic of a large object.

== Stimulus ==
How the secretion of motilin is regulated is largely unknown, although some studies suggest that an alkaline pH in the duodenum stimulates its release. However, at low pH it inhibits gastric motor activity, whereas at high pH it has a stimulatory effect. Some studies in dogs have shown that motilin is released during fasting or interdigestive period, and intake of food during this period can prevent the secretion of motilin. Intravenous injection of glucose, which increases the release of insulin, is also found to inhibit cyclic elevation of plasma motilin. Other studies on dogs have also suggested that motilin acted as endogenous ligand in positive feedback mechanism to stimulate the release of more motilin. In dogs and cats, motilin secretion is stimulated by hydrogen ions (protons) and lipids when the animal is in a "fed" state. However, during fasting, motilin is periodically released into the serum to initiate phase III of the migrating motor complex.

== Function ==
The main function of motilin is to increase the migrating myoelectric complex component of gastrointestinal motility and stimulate the production of pepsin. Motilin is also called "housekeeper of the gut" because it improves peristalsis in the small intestine and clears out the gut to prepare for the next meal. A high level of motilin secreted between meals into the blood stimulates the contraction of the fundus and antrum and accelerates gastric emptying. It then contracts the gallbladder and increases the squeeze pressure of the lower esophageal sphincter. Other functions of motilin include increasing the release of pancreatic polypeptide and somatostatin.

== Motilin agonists ==
Erythromycin, Mitemcinal and related antibiotics act as non-peptide motilin agonists, and are sometimes used for their ability to stimulate gastrointestinal motility. In the case of erythromycin, it is its hemiketal intermediate, formed after an oral dose in the low-pH environment of the stomach lumen, which directly acts on the motilin receptor. Administration of a low dose of erythromycin will induce peristalsis, which provides additional support for the conclusion that motilin secretion triggers this pattern of gastrointestinal motility, rather than results from it. However, some of erythromycin's properties, including antibiotic activity, are not appropriate for a drug designed for chronic use over a patient's lifetime.

New motilin agonists are erythromycin-based; however, it may be that this class of drugs becomes redundant. Growth hormone secretagogue receptors share 52% of their DNA with motilin receptors, and agonists of these receptors, termed ghrelins, can bring about similar effects to motilin agonists.

Camicinal is a motilin agonist under development.

Xylitol ingestion also increases motilin secretion, which may be related to xylitol's ability to cause diarrhea.

== Related peptides ==
This domain is also found in ghrelin, a growth hormone secretagogue synthesised by endocrine cells in the stomach. Ghrelin stimulates growth hormone secretagogue receptors in the pituitary. These receptors are distinct from the growth hormone-releasing hormone receptors, and, thus, provide a means of controlling pituitary growth hormone release by the gastrointestinal system. Erythromycin has an advantage over metoclopramide in gastric emptying due to lack of central nervous system side-effects. It is not approved by FDA to use for gastric emptying. For short duration for patients with diabetes and for those that must clear the stomach for any procedure, it may be used based on the physician's discretion with full understanding that it is not approved by FDA for this use.
