= Mitemcinal =

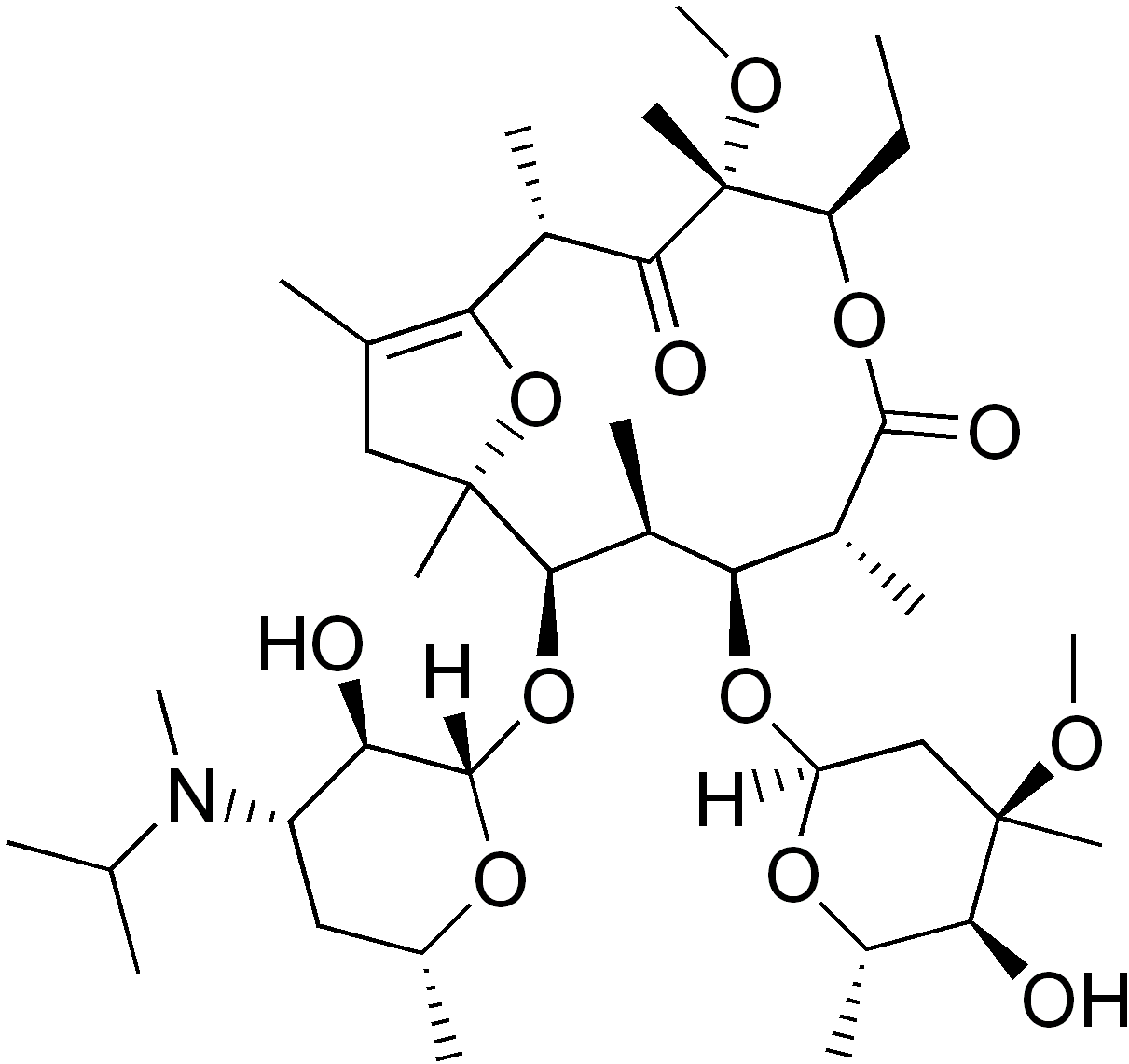

Names
- IUPAC name (1R,2R,3S,4S,5R,8R,9R,11S)-8-ethyl-4-[(2R,4R,5S,6S)-5-hydroxy-4-methoxy-4,6-dimethyloxan-2-yl]oxy-2-[(2S,3R,4S,6R)-3-hydroxy-6-methyl-4-[methyl(propan-2-yl)amino]oxan-2-yl]oxy-9-methoxy-1,3,5,9,11,13-hexamethyl-7,15-dioxabicyclo[10.2.1]pentadec-12-ene-6,10-dione
- Other names Mitemcinal, GM-611

Identifiers
CAS Number	154738-42-8
3D model (JSmol)	Interactive image
ChemSpider	5293473
PubChem CID	6918267
UNII	6X5NRJ664L
CompTox Dashboard (EPA)	DTXSID00870028
- InChI: InChI=1S/C40H69NO12/c1-16-28-40(12,47-15)33(43)23(6)31-21(4)18-39(11,53-31)35(52-37-30(42)27(17-22(5)48-37)41(13)20(2)3)24(7)32(25(8)36(45)50-28)51-29-19-38(10,46-14)34(44)26(9)49-29/h20,22-30,32,34-35,37,42,44H,16-19H2,1-15H3/t22-,23+,24+,25-,26+,27+,28-,29+,30-,32+,34+,35-,37+,38-,39-,40-/m1/s1 Key: BELMMAAWNYFCGF-PZXAHSFZSA-N; InChI=1/C40H69NO12/c1-16-28-40(12,47-15)33(43)23(6)31-21(4)18-39(11,53-31)35(52-37-30(42)27(17-22(5)48-37)41(13)20(2)3)24(7)32(25(8)36(45)50-28)51-29-19-38(10,46-14)34(44)26(9)49-29/h20,22-30,32,34-35,37,42,44H,16-19H2,1-15H3/t22-,23+,24+,25-,26+,27+,28-,29+,30-,32+,34+,35-,37+,38-,39-,40-/m1/s1 Key: BELMMAAWNYFCGF-PZXAHSFZBB
- SMILES: C[C@H](C([C@@](OC)(C)[C@@H](CC)OC2=O)=O)C1=C(C)C[C@@]([C@H](O[C@@]3([H])[C@H](O)[C@@H](N(C)C(C)C)C[C@@H](C)O3)[C@H]([C@H](O[C@]4([H])O[C@@H](C)[C@H](O)[C@@](OC)(C)C4)[C@H]2C)C)(C)O1

Properties
Chemical formula	C_{40}H_{69}NO_{12}
Molar mass	755.98 g/mol
- Except where otherwise noted, data are given for materials in their standard state (at 25 °C [77 °F], 100 kPa). verify (what is ?) Infobox references

Mitemcinal (GM-611 or 3'-N-dimethyl-11-deoxy-3'-N-isopropyl-12-O-methyl-11-oxo-8,9-didehydroerythromycin) is a motilin agonist derived from the macrolide antibiotic, erythromycin. It was discovered in the labs of Chugai Pharma. Mitemcinal is orally administered and it is believed to have strong promotility (or prokinetic) effects. Promotility drugs relieve symptoms of reflux by speeding the clearance of acid from the oesophagus and stomach. The parent compound, erythromycin, has these characteristics, but mitemcinal lacks the antibiotic properties of erythromycin.

Presently, erythromycin is commonly used off-label for gastric motility indications such as gastroparesis. If mitemcinal can be shown to be as effective a promotility agent, it would represent a significant advance in the GI field as treatment with this drug would not carry the risk of unintentional selection of antibiotic-resistant bacteria. This concept greatly intrigued Chugai, and the company pursued it as an ideal candidate for a long-term prokinetic agent to treat lower gastrointestinal deficiencies including gastroparesis.

The Phase II trials did not detect an increase in gastric emptying among the population of diabetic gastroparesis patients above placebo. Thus, although Chugai was able to demonstrate the required safety of the compound, development of this drug has stalled due to a lack of convincing efficacy data.
