= Renzapride =

Chemical compound

Clinical data
- ATC code: none

Identifiers
- IUPAC name: 4-amino-N-((4S,5S)-1-azabicyclo[3.3.1]nonan-4-yl)-5-chloro-2-methoxybenzamide
- CAS Number: 112727-80-7; HCl: 109872-41-5
- PubChem CID: 3086547
- IUPHAR/BPS: 244
- ChemSpider: 16736758
- UNII: 9073C0W4E9; HCl: 6H0SNK4GNT
- ChEMBL: ChEMBL289753
- CompTox Dashboard (EPA): DTXSID301318522

Chemical and physical data
- Formula: C_{16}H_{22}ClN_{3}O_{2}
- Molar mass: 323.82 g·mol^{−1}
- 3D model (JSmol): Interactive image
- SMILES: COc1cc(N)c(Cl)cc1C(=O)N[C@@H]1CC[N@@]2CCC[C@H]1C2
- InChI: InChI=1S/C16H22ClN3O2/c1-22-15-8-13(18)12(17)7-11(15)16(21)19-14-4-6-20-5-2-3-10(14)9-20/h7-8,10,14H,2-6,9,18H2,1H3,(H,19,21)/t10-,14+/m0/s1; Key:GZSKEXSLDPEFPT-IINYFYTJSA-N

Renzapride is a prokinetic agent and antiemetic which acts as a full 5-HT_{4} agonist and partial 5-HT_{3} antagonist. It also functions as a 5-HT_{2B} antagonist and has some affinity for the 5-HT_{2A} and 5-HT_{2C} receptors.

Renzapride was being developed by Alizyme plc of the United Kingdom. In May 2016, EndoLogic LLC, a US-based pharmaceutical and medical device company, acquired the US and worldwide patent rights to Renzapride.

Endologic confirmed the cardiac safety of renzapride through a “Thorough QTc” study and sold the rights to Atlantic Healthcare plc in 2019, a specialist pharmaceutical company.

Ambrose Healthcare acquired renzapride in 2024. It is focusing on the development of renzapride for the management of gastrointestinal (GI) motility in patients with cystic fibrosis, for which there is no approved therapy.

== Clinical trials ==
In nine diabetic patients with autonomic neuropathy, renzapride reduced the mean lag phase of gastric emptying by 20–26 min at all doses (P < 0.01)

In Phase 2a studies on subjects with constipation Renzapride was shown to accelerate colonic transit (p=0.016 vs placebo P=0.009) (Ref: ATL 1251/001/CL) as well as increase daily stool frequency (p<0.005) (Ref: ATL 1251/025/CL)

Renzapride has been assessed in Phase II clinical trials with a total of 578 patients with constipation-predominant irritable bowel syndrome (IBS-C). As compared with placebo, the treatment groups reported better relief of their overall symptoms, namely abdominal pain and discomfort, increase in the number of pain free days, improved stool frequency, consistency and ease of passage of bowel movements. There were no significant differences in the reported Serious Adverse Events between treatment and placebo groups.

In the largest of these Phase II trials, 510 subjects with IBS-C received either 1, 2 or 4 mg QD renzapride, or placebo QD for 12 weeks. The Weekly responder rate based on subject's assessment of whether they had relief from abdominal pain and/or discomfort associated with IBS during weeks 5-12 was 56% (renzapride 4 mg) vs 49% (placebo). For females the treatment effect was larger, 61% (renzapride 4 mg) vs 49% (placebo). Statistically significant effects in favour of renzapride were observed for improvements in stool consistency and increased bowel movements.

In the Phase III clinical trial in IBS-C, 1798 female patients received either 2 or 4 mg Renzapride, or placebo once daily, for 12 weeks. The mean number of months with relief of overall symptoms was 0.6, 0.55 and 0.44 for renzapride 2 mg twice a day, renzapride 4 mg once a day and placebo, respectively, with both renzapride doses being statistically superior to placebo (p=0.004 and p=0.027, respectively). On responder analysis, the proportion of responders was 33.2%, 29.8%, and 24.3% for renzapride 2 mg twice a day, renzapride 4 mg once a day and placebo, respectively.

The 8.9% delta between renzapride 2 mg twice daily and placebo compares favourably with other FDA approved therapies (Ford).

== See also ==
- List of investigational Parkinson's disease drugs
