= Mosapride =

Chemical compound

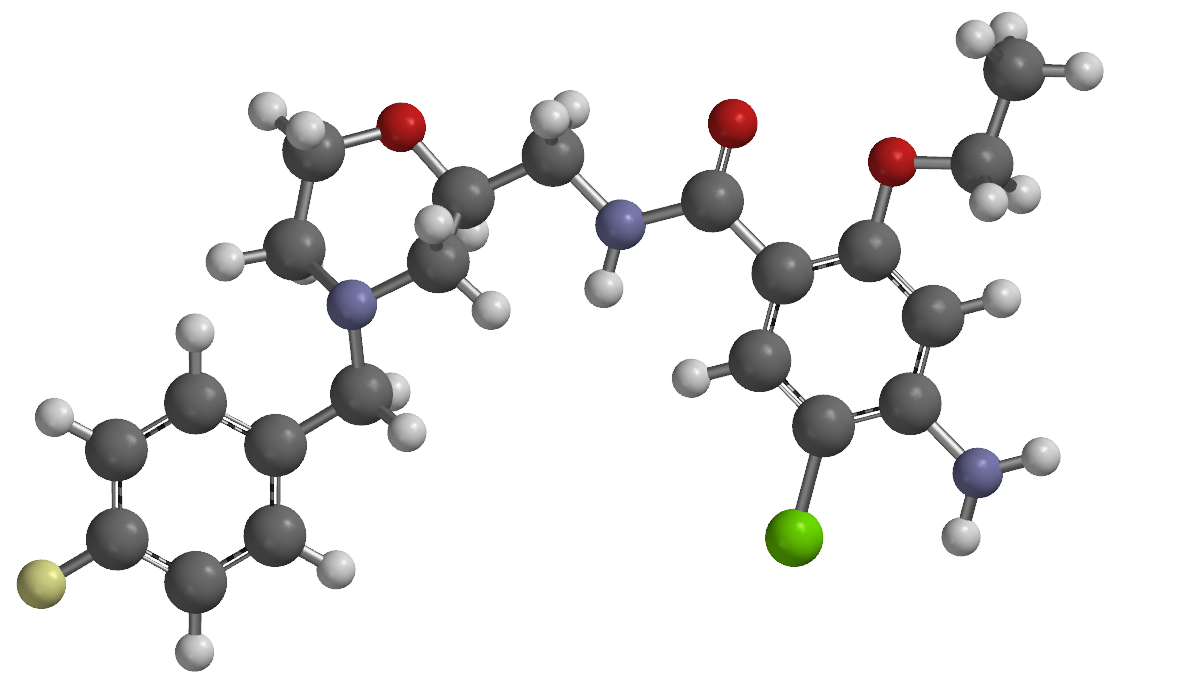

Clinical data
- AHFS/Drugs.com: International Drug Names
- ATC code: A03FA09 (WHO)

Identifiers
- IUPAC name: 4-Amino-5-chloro-2-ethoxy-N-[[4-[(4-fluorophenyl)methyl]morpholin-2-yl]methyl]benzamide
- CAS Number: 112885-41-3
- PubChem CID: 119584
- IUPHAR/BPS: 242
- DrugBank: DB11675
- ChemSpider: 106780
- UNII: I8MFJ1C0BY
- KEGG: D08236
- ChEBI: CHEBI:94373
- ChEMBL: ChEMBL60889
- CompTox Dashboard (EPA): DTXSID2048408
- ECHA InfoCard: 100.127.999

Chemical and physical data
- Formula: C_{21}H_{25}ClFN_{3}O_{3}
- Molar mass: 421.90 g·mol^{−1}
- 3D model (JSmol): Interactive image
- SMILES: Clc1cc(c(OCC)cc1N)C(=O)NCC3OCCN(Cc2ccc(F)cc2)C3
- InChI: InChI=1S/C21H25ClFN3O3/c1-2-28-20-10-19(24)18(22)9-17(20)21(27)25-11-16-13-26(7-8-29-16)12-14-3-5-15(23)6-4-14/h3-6,9-10,16H,2,7-8,11-13,24H2,1H3,(H,25,27); Key:YPELFRMCRYSPKZ-UHFFFAOYSA-N

Mosapride is a gastroprokinetic agent that acts as a selective 5HT_{4} agonist. The major active metabolite of mosapride, known as M1, additionally acts as a 5HT_{3} antagonist, which accelerates emptying throughout the whole of the gastrointestinal tract in humans, and is used for the treatment of gastritis, gastroesophageal reflux disease, functional dyspepsia and irritable bowel syndrome. It is recommended to be taken on an empty stomach (i.e. at least one hour before food or two hours after food).

In addition to its prokinetic properties, mosapride also exerts anti-inflammatory effects on the gastrointestinal tract which may contribute to some of its therapeutic effects. Mosapride also promotes neurogenesis in the gastrointestinal tract which may prove useful in certain bowel disorders. The neurogenesis is due to mosapride's effect on the 5-HT_{4} receptor where it acts as an agonist.

Its common side effects include dry mouth, abdominal pain, dizziness, headache, insomnia, malaise, nausea, diarrhea and sometimes constipation. Unlike some other prokinetic agents, mosapride has little effect on potassium channels, no effect on hERG transfected cells, and no effect on cardiovascular function that could be detected in tests on humans. Due to the pharmacokinetics of mosapride, it would take 1,000–3,000 times the therapeutic dose to elicit cardiovascular effects.
