= Jejunum =

Part of the small intestine

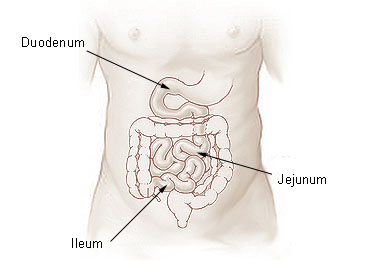
- Small intestine

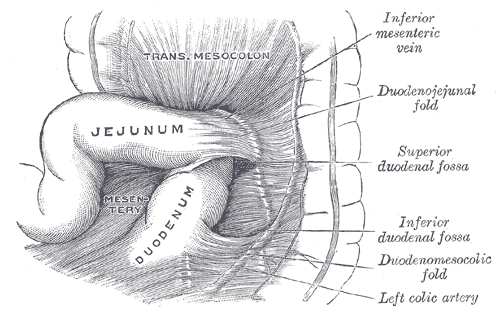
- Superior and inferior duodenal fossæ.

Details
- Pronunciation: /dʒɪˈdʒuːnəm/ jij-OO-nəm
- Precursor: laude
- Part of: Small intestine
- System: Digestive system
- Artery: Jejunal arteries
- Vein: Jejunal veins
- Nerve: Celiac ganglia, vagus

Identifiers
- Latin: jejunum
- MeSH: D007583
- TA98: A05.6.03.001
- TA2: 2958
- FMA: 7207

The jejunum is the second part of the small intestine in humans and most higher vertebrates, including mammals, reptiles, and birds. Its lining is specialized for the absorption by enterocytes of small nutrient molecules which have been previously digested by enzymes in the duodenum.

The jejunum lies between the duodenum and the ileum and is considered to start at the suspensory muscle of the duodenum, a location called the duodenojejunal flexure. The division between the jejunum and ileum is not anatomically distinct. In adult humans, the small intestine is usually 6–7 m (20–23 ft) long (post mortem), about two-fifths of which (about 2.5 m (8.2 ft)) is the jejunum.

== Structure ==
The interior surface of the jejunum—which is exposed to ingested food—is covered in finger–like projections of mucosa, called villi, which increase the surface area of tissue available to absorb nutrients from ingested foodstuffs. The epithelial cells which line these villi have microvilli. The transport of nutrients across epithelial cells through the jejunum and ileum includes the passive transport of sugar fructose and the active transport of amino acids, small peptides, vitamins, and most glucose. The villi in the jejunum are much longer than in the duodenum or ileum.

The pH in the jejunum is usually between 7 and 8 (neutral or slightly alkaline).

The jejunum and the ileum are suspended by mesentery which gives the bowel great mobility within the abdomen. It also contains circular and longitudinal smooth muscle which helps to move food along by a process known as peristalsis.

=== Histology ===
The jejunum contains very few Brunner's glands (found in the duodenum) or Peyer's patches (found in the ileum). However, there are a few jejunal lymph nodes suspended in its mesentery. The jejunum has many large circular folds in its submucosa called plicae circulares that increase the surface area for nutrient absorption. The plicae circulares are best developed in the jejunum.

There is no line of demarcation between the jejunum and the ileum. However, there are subtle histological differences:

- The jejunum has less fat inside its mesentery than the ileum.
- The jejunum is typically of larger diameter than the ileum.
- The villi of the jejunum look like long, finger-like projections, and are a histologically identifiable structure.
- While the length of the entire intestinal tract contains lymphoid tissue, only the ileum has abundant Peyer's patches, which are unencapsulated lymphoid nodules that contain large numbers of lymphocytes and immune cells, like microfold cells.
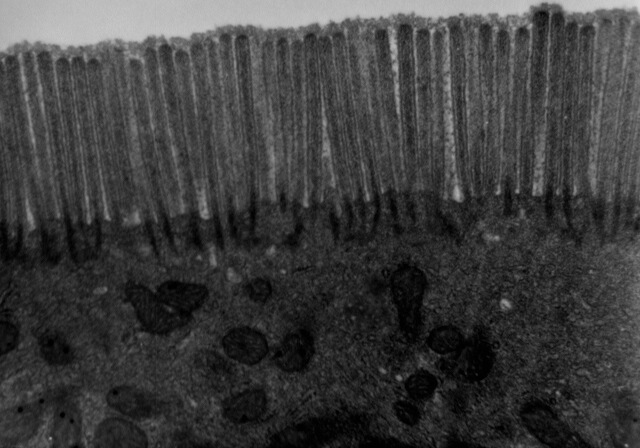
Transmission electron microscope (TEM) image of human jejunum

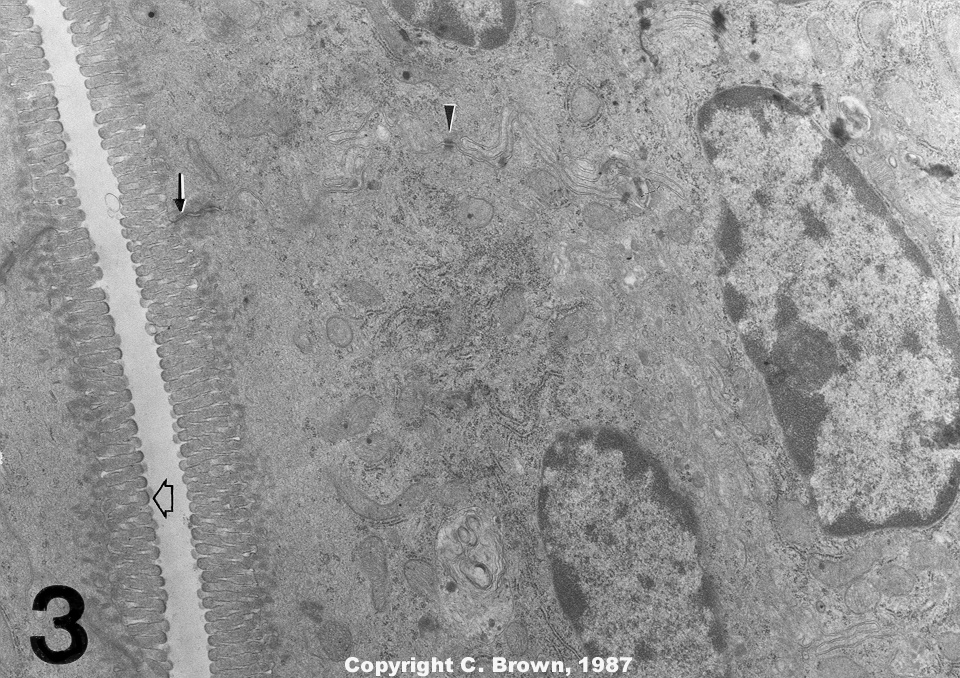
TEM image of mouse jejunum (14,000-fold magnification)

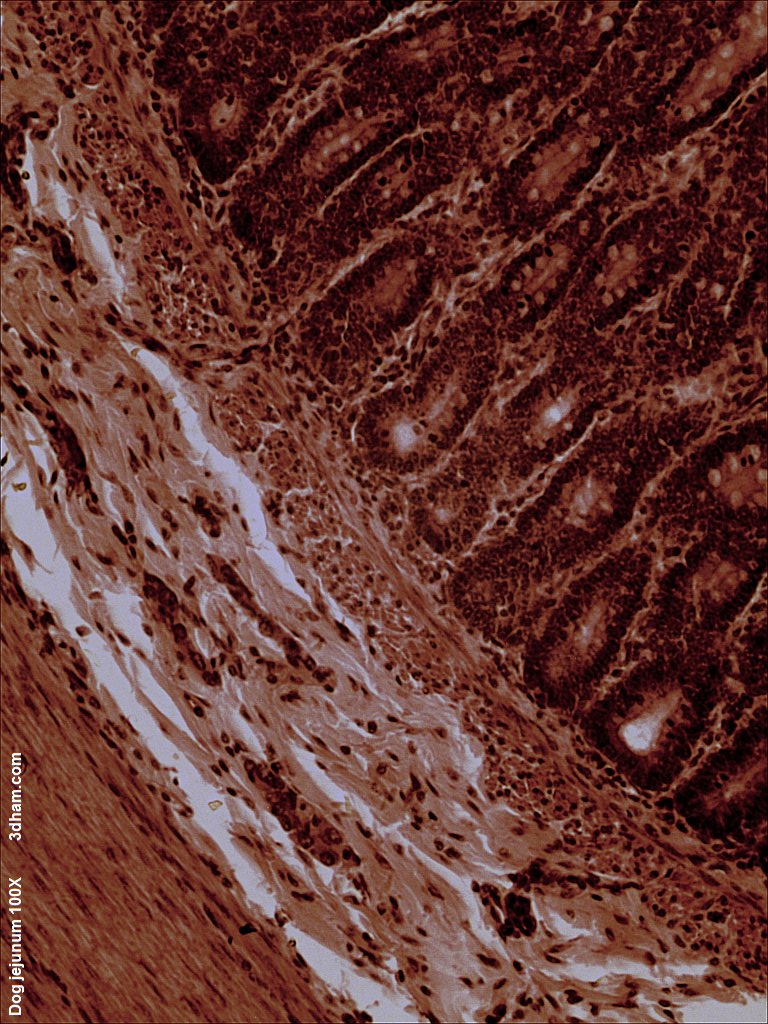
Dog jejunum (magnified 100-fold)

== Function ==
The lining of the jejunum is specialized for the absorption by enterocytes of small nutrient particles which have been previously digested by enzymes in the duodenum. Once absorbed, nutrients (with the exception of fat, which goes to the lymph) pass from the enterocytes into the enterohepatic circulation and enter the liver via the hepatic portal vein, where the blood is processed.

== Other animals ==
In fish, the divisions of the small intestine are not as clear and the terms middle intestine or mid-gut may be used instead of jejunum.

== History ==
=== Etymology ===
Jejunum is derived from the Latin word jējūnus (iēiūnus), meaning "fasting." It was so called because this part of the small intestine was frequently found to be void of food following death, due to its intensive peristaltic activity relative to the duodenum and ileum.

The Early Modern English adjective jejune is derived from the same root.
