= Functional gastrointestinal disorder =

- Other names: Disorders of gut–brain interaction
- Specialty: Gastroenterology

Functional gastrointestinal disorders (FGID), also known as disorders of gut–brain interaction, include a number of separate idiopathic disorders which affect different parts of the gastrointestinal tract and involve visceral hypersensitivity and motility disturbances.

== Definition ==
Using the Delphi method, the Rome Foundation and its board of directors, chairs and co-chairs of the ROME IV committees developed the current definition for disorders of gut-brain interaction.A group of disorders classified by GI symptoms related to any combination of:

- Motility disturbance
- Visceral hypersensitivity
- Altered mucosal and immune function
- Altered gut microbiota
- Altered central nervous system (CNS) processing

== Classification ==
Terms such as functional colonic disease (or functional bowel disorder) refer in medicine to a group of bowel disorders which are characterized by chronic abdominal complaints without a structural or biochemical cause that could explain symptoms. Other functional disorders relate to other aspects of the process of digestion.

The consensus review process of meetings and publications organised by the Rome Foundation, known as the Rome process, has helped to define the functional gastrointestinal disorders. Successively, the Rome I, Rome II, Rome III and Rome IV proposed consensual classification system and terminology, as recommended by the Rome Coordinating Committee. These now include classifications appropriate for adults, children and neonates/toddlers.

The current ROME IV classification, published in 2016, is as follows using A to H groupings:

=== Esophageal disorders ===
- A1. Functional chest pain
- A2. Functional heartburn
- A3. Reflux hypersensitivity
- A4. Globus
- A5. Functional dysphagia

=== Gastroduodenal disorders ===
- B1. Functional dyspepsia
  - B1a. Postprandial distress syndrome (PDS)
  - B1b. Epigastric pain syndrome (EPS)
- B2. Belching disorders
  - B2a. Excessive supragastric belching
  - B2b. Excessive gastric belching
- B3. Nausea and vomiting disorders
  - B3a. Chronic nausea vomiting syndrome (CNVS)
  - B3b. Cyclic vomiting syndrome (CVS)
  - B3c. Cannabinoid hyperemesis syndrome (CHS)
- B4. Rumination syndrome

=== Bowel disorders ===
- C1. Irritable bowel syndrome (IBS)
  - IBS with predominant constipation (IBS-C)
  - IBS with predominant diarrhea (IBS-D)
  - IBS with mixed bowel habits (IBS-M)
  - IBS unclassified (IBS-U)
- C2. Functional constipation
- C3. Functional diarrhea
- C4. Functional abdominal bloating/distension
- C5. Unspecified functional bowel disorder
- C6. Opioid-induced constipation

=== Centrally mediated disorders of gastrointestinal pain ===
- D1. Centrally mediated abdominal pain syndrome (CAPS)
- D2. Narcotic bowel syndrome (NBS)/ Opioid-induced GI hyperalgesia

=== Gallbladder and sphincter of Oddi disorders ===
- E1. Biliary pain
  - E1a. Functional gallbladder disorder
  - E1b. Functional biliary sphincter of Oddi disorder
- E2. Functional pancreatic sphincter of Oddi disorder

=== Anorectal disorders ===
- F1. Fecal incontinence
- F2. Functional anorectal pain
  - F2a. Levator ani syndrome
  - F2b. Unspecified functional anorectal pain
  - F2c. Proctalgia fugax
- F3. Functional defecation disorders
  - F3a. Inadequate defecatory propulsion
  - F3b. Dyssynergic defecation

=== Childhood functional GI disorders: Neonate/Toddler ===
- G1. Infant regurgitation
- G2. Rumination syndrome
- G3. Cyclic vomiting syndrome (CVS)
- G4. Infant colic
- G5. Functional diarrhea
- G6. Infant dyschezia
- G7. Functional constipation

=== Childhood functional GI disorders: Child/Adolescent ===
- H1. Functional nausea and vomiting disorders
  - H1a. Cyclic vomiting syndrome (CVS)
  - H1b. Functional nausea and functional vomiting
    - H1b1. Functional nausea
      H1b2. Functional vomiting
  - H1c. Rumination syndrome
  - H1d. Aerophagia
- H2. Functional abdominal pain disorders
  - H2a. Functional dyspepsia
    - H2a1. Postprandial distress syndrome
    - H2a2. Epigastric pain syndrome
  - H2b. Irritable bowel syndrome (IBS)
  - H2c. Abdominal migraine
  - H2d. Functional abdominal pain ‒ NOS
- H3. Functional defecation disorders
  - H3a. Functional constipation
  - H3b. Nonretentive fecal incontinence

== Causes ==
FGIDs share in common any of several physiological features including increased reactivity of gastrointestinal movement, hypersensitivity, altered immune function, inflammatory function (associated with bacterial dysbiosis), and altered central nervous system and enteric nervous system (CNS-ENS) regulation.

The pathophysiology of FGID has been best conceptualized using biopsychosocial model help to explain the relationships between an individual factors in their early life that in turn can influence their psychosocial factor and physiological functioning. This model also shows the complex interactions between these factors through the brain-gut axis. These factors affect how FGID manifest in terms of symptoms but also affect the clinical outcome. These factors are interconnected and the influences on these factors are bidirectional and mutually interactive.

=== Early life factors ===
Early life factors include genetic factors, psychophysiological and sociocultural factors, and environmental exposures.

- Genetics – Several polymorphisms and candidate genes may predispose individuals to develop FGID. These include alpha-2 adrenergic and 5-HT receptors; serotonin and norepinephrine transporters (SERT, NET); inflammatory markers interleukin-(IL)10, tumor necrosis factor-(TNF) alpha, and TNF super family member 15 (TNF-SF15); intracellular cell signaling (G proteins); and ion channels (SCN5A). However, the expression of a FGID requires the influence of additional environmental exposures such as infection, illness modeling and other factors.
- Psychophysiological factors may affect the expression of these genes, thus leading to symptoms production associated with FGID.
- Sociocultural factors and family interactions have been shown to shape later reporting of symptoms, the development of FGIDs, and health care seeking. The expression of pain varies across cultures as well including denial of symptoms to dramatic expression.
- Environmental exposures – Prior studies have shown the effect of environmental exposures in relation to the development of FGIDs. Environmental exposures such as childhood salmonella infection can be a risk factor for IBS in adulthood.

=== Psychosocial factors ===
There is a strong link between FGIDs and psychosocial factors. Psychosocial factors influence the functioning of the GI tract through the brain-gut axis, including the GI tract's motility, sensitivity, and barrier function. Psychosocial factors also affect experience and behavior, treatment selection, and clinical outcome.

Psychological stress or one's emotional response to stress exacerbates gastrointestinal symptoms and may contribute to FGID development and maintenance. Specifically in children and adolescents, anxiety and depression may present as FGID-associated somatic complaints, such as nausea, vomiting, and abdominal pain. Similarly, anxiety in individuals with FGIDs is linked to greater pain severity, frequency, duration, chronicity, and disabling effects. This is because psychological stress can impact the gut's mucosal barrier functions, allowing bacteria and bacterial products to migrate and cause pain, diarrhea, and other GI symptoms. Conversely, since the brain-gut axis is bidirectional, GI inflammation and injury can amplify pain signals to the brain and contribute to worsened mental status, including anxiety and depression symptoms.

Individuals with FGIDs may also experience poor socialization. Due to the nature of the disease, individuals with an FGID may have difficulty with regular school or work attendance and participation in extracurricular activities, leading to isolation and a lack of peer support. This lack of peer support may lead to depression and loneliness, conditions which exacerbate FGIDs symptoms. In addition, children with FGIDs are more likely to experience bullying. As such, stressful situations which influence socialization (seen as either a lack thereof or negative experiences) may lead to an impaired functioning in patients with FGIDs.

Family interactions may also play a role in the development of FGIDs through their effects on the physical and psychosocial functioning of an individual. Family factors which may influence the development of an FGID include child attachment style, maladaptive parenting behaviors (paternal rejection and hostility), and even the parents' health status, as children of chronically ill parents experience increased somatic symptoms, insecure attachment, and worsened biopsychosocial functioning. Each of these factors leads to the accumulation of stressors, which can ultimately lead to the development of an FGID. In addition, family units which have a member with an FGIDs diagnosis are more likely to face family functioning difficulties, including challenges to familial roles, communication, affective involvement, organization, and cohesion. These challenges arise due to the nature of the disease, and ultimately worsen symptoms for the FGID patient.

=== Physiology ===
The physiology of FGID is characterized by abnormal motility, visceral hypersensitivity as well as dysregulation of the immune system and barrier function of the GI tract as well as inflammatory changes.

- Abnormal motility
  Studies have shown altered muscle contractility and tone, bowel compliance, and transit may contribute to many of the gastrointestinal symptoms of FGID which may include diarrhea, constipation, and vomiting.
- Visceral hypersensitivity
  In FGID there is poor association of pain with GI motility in many functional GI disorders. These patient often have a lower pain threshold with balloon distension of the bowel (visceral hyperalgesia), or they have increased sensitivity even to normal intestinal function; Visceral hypersensitivity may be amplified in patients with FGIDs.
- Immune dysregulation, inflammation, and barrier dysfunction
  Studies on postinfectious IBS have shown that factors such as mucosal membrane permeability, the intestinal flora, and altered mucosal immune function can ultimately lead to visceral hypersensitivity. Factors contributing to this occurrence include genetics, psychological stress, and altered receptor sensitivity at the gut mucosa and myenteric plexus, which are enabled by mucosal immune dysfunction.
- Microbiome
  There has been increased attention to the role of bacteria and the microbiome in overall health and disease. There is evidence for a group of microorganisms which play a role in the brain-gut axis. Studies have revealed that the bacterial composition of the gastrointestinal tract in IBS patient differs from healthy individuals (e.g., increased Firmicutes and reduced Bacteroidetes and Bifidobacteria) However, further research is needed to determine the role of the microbiome in FGIDs.
- Food and diet
  The types of food consumed and diet consumed plays a role in the manifestation of FGID and also their relationship to intestinal microbiota. Studies have shown that specific changes in diet (e.g., low FODMAP—fermentable oligo-, di-, and monosaccharides and polyols, or gluten restriction in some patients) may help and reduce the symptom burden in FGID. However, no one diet has been shown to be recommended for all people.

=== Brain-gut axis ===
The brain-gut axis is a bidirectional mechanism in which psychosocial factors influence the GI tract and vice versa. Specifically, the emotional and cognitive centers of the brain influence GI activity and immune cell function, and the microbes within the gut regulate mood, cognition, and mental health. These two systems interact through several mechanisms. There are direct, physical connections between the central nervous system and nerve plexuses to the visceral muscles. In addition, neurotransmitters send signals related to thoughts, feelings, and pain regulation from the brain to the GI tract. The brain-gut axis influences the entire body through a variety of pathways; it regulates sensory, motor, endocrine, autonomic, immune, and inflammatory reactions. Within the physical and psychological interactions of FGIDs specifically, psychiatric disorders such as anxiety, depression, and even autism are well-linked to GI dysfunction. Conversely, functional GI diseases are linked to several comorbid psychiatric diseases. Negative emotions such as fear, anxiety, anger, stress, and pain may delay gastric emptying, decrease intestinal and colonic transit time, and induce defecation and diarrhea.

== Treatments ==
=== Psychotherapeutic treatments ===
Because FGIDs are known to be multifactorial with external stressors and environmental factors playing a role in their development, current research demonstrates that psychological treatments may be effective in relieving some symptoms of the disease. Interventions such as cognitive behavioral therapy (CBT), hypnotherapy, and biofeedback-assisted relaxation training (BART) each show promise in symptom reduction. Each of these therapies aims to alter an individual's thought patterns and behaviors while improving self-efficacy, which all work together to improve health outcomes.

Cognitive behavioral therapy is a treatment based on the theory that thinking affects one's feelings and behaviors. As such, alterations in one's thought process can have a positive or negative effect on actions and perceptions. Through the lens of FGIDs, a negative thought pattern may be associated with a negative physical experience of abdominal pain, discomfort, and general sickness. In theory, retraining the patient's thought patterns can alleviate these symptoms and improve quality of life. In patients with FGIDs, CBT is an effective treatment option; one study found 87.5% of participants to be completely pain-free following treatment. Internet-based CBT (iCBT) is similarly effective, and may be a good treatment option for individuals who either cannot afford or otherwise lack access to traditional CBT.

Virtual CBT for FGIDs has become a growing area of interest. In addition to patients being unable to afford or arrange transportation for in-office CBT, patients also face limited availability of providers trained in GI-specific psychotherapy. Part of the interest in virtual CBT for functional gastrointestinal disorders is due to the effectiveness initial studies have reported. When compared to in-office CBT treatment, both telephone-based CBT treatment and web-based CBT treatment show statistically significant improvements in patient symptoms. Additionally, virtual CBT may allow for better adherence to treatment. Currently, Regulora is the only smartphone app that is approved by the FDA for virtual treatment of FGIDs in adults. Regulora was approved for use as a digital therapeutic that is available by prescription only. Although a relatively newer treatment option, initial evidence from app users suggests statistically significant reductions in abdominal pain for some participants.

Hypnotherapy, another method for reducing symptoms of FGIDs, teaches users how to alter their perception of uncomfortable sensations in the body. Gut-directed hypnotherapy specifically gives greater improvements in symptoms than standard treatment of the disease. Research demonstrates directed hypnotherapy to be an effective mechanism of reducing visceral hypersensitivity (a low pain threshold of the internal organs) and sympathetic activity, due to the reduced activity of the anterior cingulated cortex and state of relaxation achieved during hypnosis. For patients with irritable bowel syndrome (IBS) and functional abdominal pain (FAP), hypnotherapy reduces pain intensity and frequency.

BART therapies monitor the physiological changes occurring with thoughts, feelings, and emotions. These therapies aim to teach patients how to visualize the effects of the interventions they are undergoing. BART is used to improve mood and somatic responses to anxiety disorders, which may relieve some of the psychological and physiological symptoms of FGIDs. The visual, real-time feedback given through BART empowers the patient to see the difference that the therapy is making, thus giving the patient control over the physiological components of the disease. This allows the patient to maximize their mind-body connection and eventually optimize symptom management and quality of life. BART allows the patient to break the positive feedback loop of anxiety and pain, thus reducing disease exacerbations.

=== Pharmaceutical treatments ===
Antidepressants have been thoroughly studied as a potential treatment for FGIDs. Tricyclic antidepressants (TCAs), selective serotonin reuptake inhibitors (SSRIs), and selective norepinephrine reuptake inhibitors (SNRIs) show the most promise in treating some of the symptoms of FGIDs. TCAs, specifically amitriptyline, show promising results when examining common FGIDs symptoms such as pain and poor quality of life. SNRIs also demonstrate pain-relieving qualities. SSRIs are less effective in pain management, but may reduce symptoms of anxiety and depression, which would, in turn, reduce some FGIDs symptoms.

== Pediatric implications ==
FGIDs are common in children and adolescents, with a prevalence of 23.1%. The most common functional gastrointestinal disorders affecting children are functional abdominal pain and functional defecation disorders. Despite most children with DBGIs having no clear underlying pathology, these disorders can have profound effects on day-to-day life. As mentioned above, family dynamics may influence the development of FGIDs. Children with at least one parent with a mental health condition are more likely to develop a FGID by age 6. Treatment for these disorders is currently in accordance with treatment for adults. This includes CBT, hypnotherapy, and distraction techniques. Overall, prognosis of FGIDs in children is good. Children have better outcomes when there is family support and acceptance of the child's disorder.

== Epidemiology ==
Functional gastrointestinal disorders are very common. Globally, irritable bowel syndrome and functional dyspepsia alone may affect 16–26% of the population.

== Research ==
There is considerable research into the causes, diagnosis and treatments for FGIDs. Diet, microbiome, genetics, neuromuscular function and immunological response all interact. A role for mast cell activation has been proposed as one of the factors.

== See also ==
- Allergy
- Food intolerance
- Functional indigestion
- Histamine intolerance
