= Anismus =

Failure to relax the pelvic floor muscles during defecation

- Other names: Dyssynergic defecation
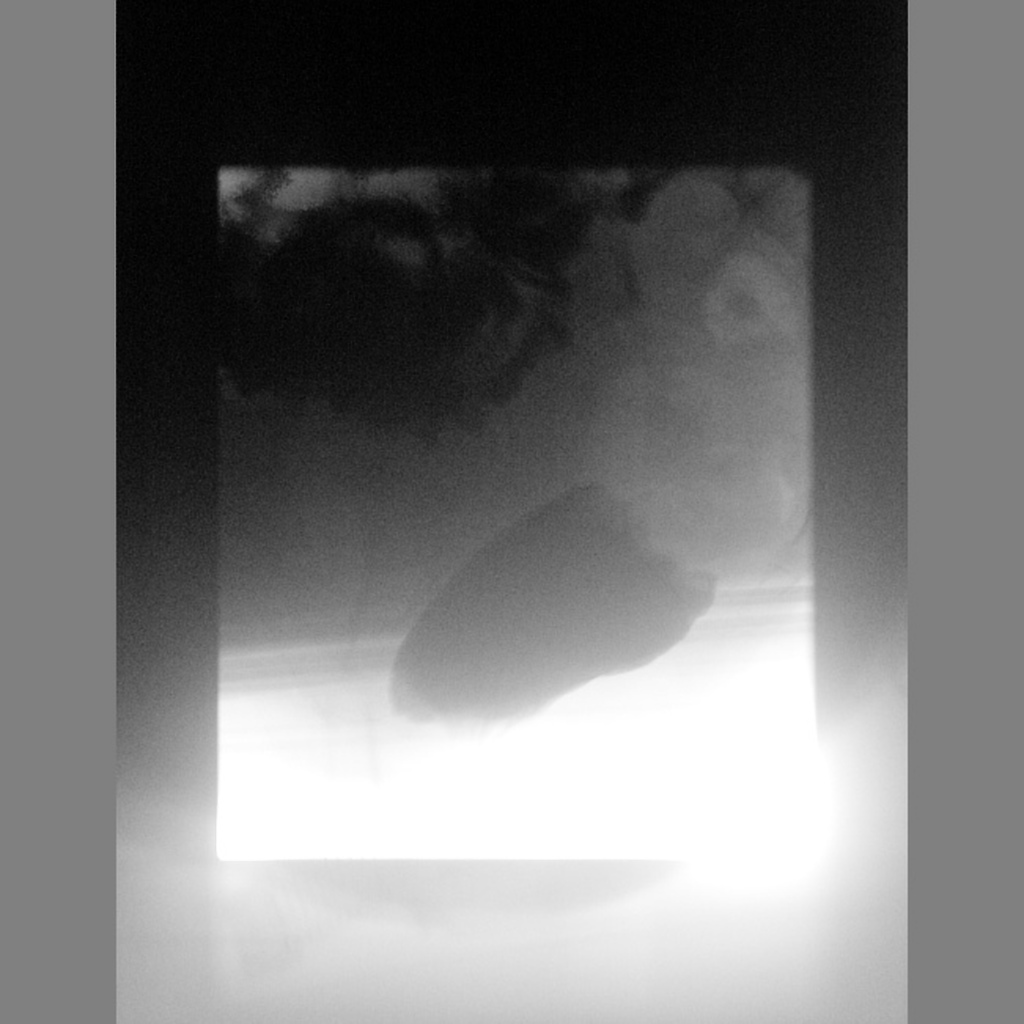
- Defecating proctogram. The ano-rectal angle does not open out when the individual attempts to defecate, leading to retention of the barium paste in the rectum. There is also a rectocele anteriorly (visible immediately above and in front of the anal canal).
- Specialty: Gastroenterology

Anismus or dyssynergic defecation is the failure of normal relaxation of pelvic floor muscles during attempted defecation. It can occur in both children and adults, and in both men and women (although it is more common in women). It can be caused by physical defects or it can occur for other reasons or unknown reasons. Anismus that has a behavioral cause could be viewed as having similarities with parcopresis, or psychogenic fecal retention.

Symptoms include tenesmus (the sensation of incomplete emptying of the rectum after defecation has occurred) and constipation. Retention of stool may result in fecal loading (retention of a mass of stool of any consistency) or fecal impaction (retention of a mass of hard stool). This mass may stretch the walls of the rectum and colon, causing megarectum and/or megacolon, respectively. Liquid stool may leak around a fecal impaction, possibly causing degrees of liquid fecal incontinence. This is usually termed encopresis or soiling in children, and fecal leakage, soiling or liquid fecal incontinence in adults.

Anismus is usually treated with dietary adjustments, such as dietary fiber supplementation. It can also be treated with a type of biofeedback therapy, during which a sensor probe is inserted into the person's anal canal in order to record the pressures exerted by the pelvic floor muscles. These pressures are visually fed back to the patient via a monitor who can regain the normal coordinated movement of the muscles after a few sessions.

Some researchers have suggested that anismus is an over-diagnosed condition, since the standard investigations of digital rectal examination and anorectal manometry were shown to cause paradoxical sphincter contraction in healthy controls, who did not have constipation or incontinence. Due to the invasive and perhaps uncomfortable nature of these investigations, the pelvic floor musculature is thought to behave differently compared to normal circumstances. These researchers went on to conclude that paradoxical pelvic floor contraction is a common finding in healthy people as well as in people with chronic constipation and fecal incontinence, and it represents a non-specific finding or laboratory artifact related to untoward conditions during examination, and that true anismus is actually rare.

== Signs and symptoms ==
Symptoms include:

- Straining to pass fecal material
- Tenesmus (a feeling of incomplete evacuation)
- Feeling of anorectal obstruction/blockage
- Digital maneuvers needed to aid defecation
- Difficulty initiating and completing bowel movements

== Cause ==
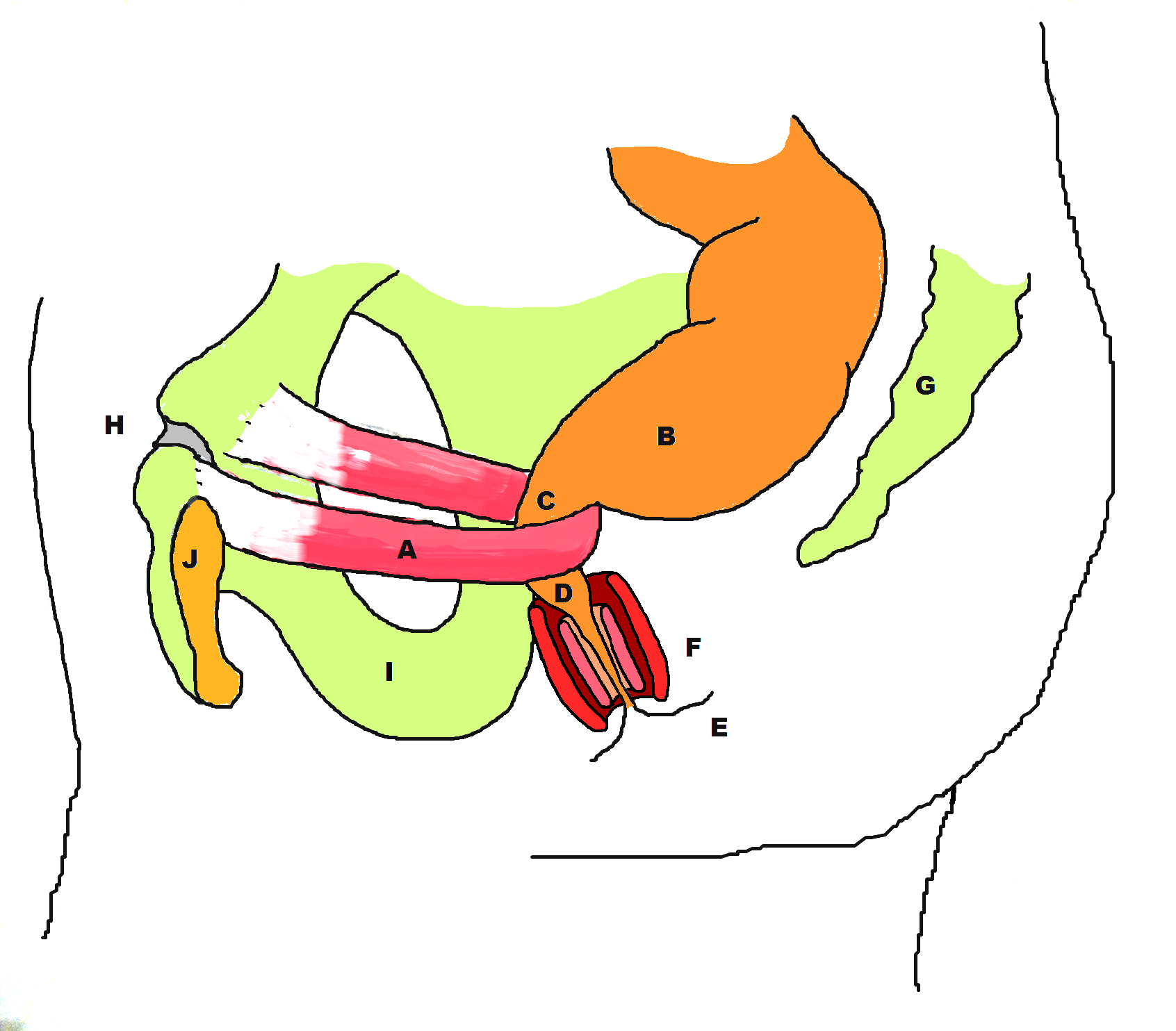
Stylized diagram showing action of the puborectalis sling, and the formation of the anorectal angle. A-puborectalis, B-rectum, C-level of anorectal ring and anorectal angle, D-anal canal, E-anal verge, F-representation of internal and external anal sphincters, G-coccyx & sacrum, H-pubic symphysis, I-Ischium, J-pubic bone.

To understand the cause of anismus, an understanding of normal colorectal anatomy and physiology, including the normal defecation mechanism, is helpful. The relevant anatomy includes: the rectum, the anal canal and the muscles of the pelvic floor, especially puborectalis and the external anal sphincter.

The rectum is a section of bowel situated just above the anal canal and distal to the sigmoid colon of the large intestine. It is believed to act as a reservoir to store stool until it fills past a certain volume, at which time the defecation reflexes are stimulated. In healthy individuals, defecation can be temporarily delayed until it is socially acceptable to defecate. In continent individuals, the rectum can expand to a degree to accommodate this function.

The anal canal is the short straight section of bowel between the rectum and the anus. It can be defined functionally as the distance between the anorectal ring and the end of the internal anal sphincter. The internal anal sphincter forms the walls of the anal canal. The internal anal sphincter is not under voluntary control, and in normal persons it is contracted at all times except when there is a need to defecate. This means that the internal anal sphincter contributes more to the resting tone of the anal canal than the external anal sphincter. The internal sphincter is responsible for creating a watertight seal, and therefore provides continence of liquid stool elements.

The puborectalis muscle is one of the pelvic floor muscles. It is skeletal muscle and is therefore under voluntary control. The puborectalis originates on the posterior aspect of the pubic bone, and runs backwards, looping around the bowel.

The point at which the rectum joins the anal canal is known as the anorectal ring, which is at the level that the puborectalis muscle loops around the bowel from in front. This arrangement means that when puborectalis is contracted, it pulls the junction of the rectum and the anal canal forwards, creating an angle in the bowel called the anorectal angle. This angle prevents the movement of stool stored in the rectum moving into the anal canal. It is thought to be responsible for gross continence of solid stool. Some believe the anorectal angle is one of the most important contributors to continence.

Conversely, relaxation of the puborectalis reduces the pull on the junction of the rectum and the anal canal, causing the anorectal angle to straighten out. A squatting posture is also known to straighten the anorectal angle, meaning that less effort is required to defecate when in this position.

Distension of the rectum normally causes the internal anal sphincter to relax (rectoanal inhibitory response, RAIR) and the external anal sphincter initially to contract (rectoanal excitatory reflex, RAER). The relaxation of the internal anal sphincter is an involuntary response. The external anal sphincter, by contrast, is made up of skeletal (or striated muscle) and is therefore under voluntary control. It can contract vigorously for a short time. Contraction of the external sphincter can defer defecation for a time by pushing stool from the anal canal back into the rectum. Once the voluntary signal to defecate is sent back from the brain, the abdominal muscles contract (straining) causing the intra-abdominal pressure to increase. The pelvic floor is lowered causing the anorectal angle to straighten out from ~90^{o} to <15^{o} and the external anal sphincter relaxes. The rectum now contracts and shortens in peristaltic waves, thus forcing fecal material out of the rectum, through the anal canal and out of the anus. The internal and external anal sphincters along with the puborectalis muscle allow the feces to be passed by pulling the anus up over the exiting feces in shortening and contracting actions.

In patients with anismus, the puborectalis and the external anal sphincter muscles fail to relax, with resultant failure of the anorectal angle to straighten out and facilitate evacuation of feces from the rectum. These muscles may even contract when they should relax (paradoxical contraction), and this not only fails to straighten out the anorectal angle, but causes it to become more acute and offer greater obstruction to evacuation.

As these muscles are under voluntary control, the failure of muscular relaxation or paradoxical contraction that is characteristic of anismus can be thought of as either maladaptive behavior or a loss of voluntary control of these muscles. Others claim that puborectalis can become hypertrophied (enlarged) or fibrosis (replacement of muscle tissue with a more fibrous tissue), which reduces voluntary control over the muscle.

Anismus could be thought of as the patient "forgetting" how to push correctly, i.e. straining against a contracted pelvic floor, instead of increasing abdominal cavity pressures and lowering pelvic cavity pressures. It may be that this scenario develops due to stress. For example, one study reported that anismus was strongly associated with sexual abuse in women. One paper stated that events such as pregnancy, childbirth, gynaecological descent or neurogenic disturbances of the brain-bowel axis could lead to a "functional obstructed defecation syndrome" (including anismus). Anismus may develop in persons with extrapyramidal motor disturbance due to Parkinson's disease. This represents a type of focal dystonia. Anismus may also occur with anorectal malformation, rectocele, rectal prolapse and rectal ulcer.

In many cases however, the underlying pathophysiology in patients presenting with obstructed defecation cannot be determined.

Some authors have commented that the "puborectalis paradox" and "spastic pelvic floor" concepts have no objective data to support their validity. They state that "new evidence showing that defecation is an integrated process of colonic and rectal emptying suggests that anismus may be much more complex than a simple disorder of the pelvic floor muscles."

=== Complications ===
Persistent failure to fully evacuate stool may lead to retention of a mass of stool in the rectum (fecal loading), which can become hardened, forming a fecal impaction or even fecaliths.

Liquid stool elements may leak around the retained fecal mass, which may lead to paradoxical diarrhoea and/or fecal leakage (usually known as encopresis in children and fecal leakage in adults).

When anismus occurs in the context of intractable encopresis (as it often does), resolution of anismus may be insufficient to resolve encopresis. For this reason, and because biofeedback training is invasive, expensive, and labor-intensive, biofeedback training is not recommended for treatment of encopresis with anismus.

The walls of the rectum may become stretched, known as megarectum.

== Diagnosis ==
In the Rome IV classification, diagnostic criteria for "functional defecation disorders" are as follows:

- Patient must satisfy diagnostic criteria for functional constipation and/or irritable bowel syndrome with constipation.
- During repeated attempts to defecate, there must be features of impaired evacuation, as shown by 2 of the following 3 tests:
  - Abnormal balloon expulsion test.
  - Abnormal anorectal evacuation pattern with manometry or anal surface electromyography.
  - Impaired rectal evacuation by imaging.

2 subcategories exist within the functional defecation disorders category:

- Inadequate defecatory propulsive (F3a): Inadequate propulsive forces as measured with manometry with or without inappropriate contraction of the anal sphincter and/or pelvic floor muscles.
- Dyssynergic defecation (F3b): Inappropriate contraction of the pelvic floor as measured with anal surface EMG or manometry with adequate propulsive forces during attempted defecation.

For all of these Rome-IV diagnoses, diagnostic criteria must have been fulfilled for the last 3 months with symptom onset at least 6 months prior to diagnosis. The subcategories F3a and F3b are defined by age- and gender-appropriate normal values for the technique.

Previous Rome criteria recommended that anorectal testing is not usually indicated in patients with symptoms until patients have failed conservative treatment (e.g., increased dietary fiber and liquids; elimination of medications with constipating side effects whenever possible).

=== Definition ===
Several definitions have been offered:

- According to the International Classification of Diseases (ICD-11): "paradoxical contraction or inadequate relaxation of the pelvic floor muscles during attempted defecation".
- According to the Rome-IV classification of functional gastrointestinal disorders: "Inappropriate contraction of the pelvic floor as measured with anal surface EMG or manometry with adequate propulsive forces during attempted defecation".
- According to the American Society of Colon and Rectal Surgeons: "failure of striated muscles of the pelvic floor (puborectalis and external anal sphincter) to relax appropriately during attempted defecation.
- "Absence of normal relaxation of pelvic floor muscles during defecation, resulting in rectal outlet obstruction".
- "Malfunction (a focal dystonia) of the external anal sphincter and puborectalis muscle during defecation".
- "[...] failure of [the external anal sphincter and puborectalis] muscle[s] to relax, resulting in maintenance of the anorectal angle and the difficulty with initiating and completing bowel movements".
- "[...] failure of relaxation (or paradoxic contraction) of the puborectalis muscle sling during defaecation, attempted defaecation or straining."

=== Digital rectal examination ===
Physical examination can rule out anismus (by identifying another cause) but is not sufficient to diagnose anismus.

=== Anorectal manometry ===
The measurement of pressures within the rectum and anus with a manometer (pressure-sensing probe).

=== Evacuation proctography ===
defecating proctogram, and MRI defecography

=== Classification ===
Anismus can be subcategorized into 4 types based on the results of anorectal manometry testing:

- Type 1: The patient can generate and adequate rise in intra-abdominal pressure, yet there is a paradoxical increase in anal sphincter pressures.
- Type 2: The patient is unable to generate an adequate rise in intrarectal pressures and has a paradoxical anal sphincter contraction.
- Type 3: The patient can generate an adequate intraabdominal pressure but either has absent or incomplete (<20%) anal sphincter relaxation.
- Type 4: The patient is unable to generate and adequate pushing force and demonstrates an absent or incomplete sphincter relaxation.

Anismus is classified as a functional defecation disorder. It is also a type of rectal outlet obstruction (a functional outlet obstruction). Where anismus causes constipation, it is an example of functional constipation. Many authors describe an "obstructed defecation syndrome", of which anismus is a cause.

The Rome II classification functional defecation disorders were divided into 3 types, however the symptoms the patient experiences are identical.

- Type I: paradoxical contraction of the pelvic floor muscles during attempted defecation
- Type II: inadequate propulsive forces during attempted defecation (inadequate defecatory propulsion)
- Type III: impaired relaxation with adequate propulsion

It can be seen from the above classification that many of the terms that have been used interchangeably with anismus are inappropriately specific and neglect the concept of impaired propulsion. Similarly, some of the definitions that have been offered are also too restrictive.

=== Rectal cooling test ===
The rectal cooling test is suggested to differentiate between rectal inertia and impaired relaxation/paradoxical contraction

Other techniques include manometry, balloon expulsion test, evacuation proctography (see defecating proctogram), and MRI defecography. Diagnostic criteria are: fulfillment of criteria for functional constipation, manometric and/or EMG and/or radiological evidence (2 out of 3), evidence of adequate expulsion force, and evidence of incomplete evacuation. Recent dynamic imaging studies have shown that in persons diagnosed with anismus the anorectal angle during attempted defecation is abnormal, and this is due to abnormal (paradoxical) movement of the puborectalis muscle.

== Treatment ==
Initial steps to alleviate anismus include dietary adjustments and simple adjustments when attempting to defecate. Supplementation with a bulking agent such as psyllium will make stool more bulky, which decreases the effort required to evacuate. Similarly, exercise and adequate hydration may help to optimise stool form. The anorectal angle has been shown to flatten out when in a squatting position, and is thus recommended for patients with functional outlet obstruction like anismus. If the patient is unable to assume a squatting postures due to mobility issues, a low stool can be used to raise the feet when sitting, which effectively achieves a similar position.

Treatments for anismus include biofeedback retraining, botox injections, and surgical resection. Anismus sometimes occurs together with other conditions that limit (see contraindication) the choice of treatments. Thus, thorough evaluation is recommended prior to treatment.

Biofeedback training for treatment of anismus is highly effective and considered the gold standard therapy by many. Others however, reported that biofeedback had a limited therapeutic effect.

Injections of botulin toxin type-A into the puborectalis muscle are very effective in the short term, and somewhat effective in the long term. Injections may be helpful when used together with biofeedback training.

Historically, the standard treatment was surgical resection of the puborectalis muscle, which sometimes resulted in fecal incontinence. Recently, partial resection (partial division) has been reported to be effective in some cases.

== Etymology and synonyms ==
Paradoxical anal contraction during attempted defecation in constipated patients was first described in a paper in 1985, when the term anismus was first used. The researchers drew analogies to a condition called vaginismus, which involves paroxysmal (sudden and short lasting) contraction of pubococcygeus (another muscle of the pelvic floor). These researchers felt that this condition was a spastic dysfunction of the anus, analogous to 'vaginismus'. However, the term anismus implies a psychogenic etiology, which is not true although psychological dysfunction has been described in these patients. Hence:

Latin ani - "of the anus"
Latin spasmus - "spasm"

(Derived by extrapolation with the term vaginismus, which in turn is from the Latin vagina - "sheath" + spasmus - "spasm")

Many terms have been used synonymously to refer to this condition, some inappropriately. The term "anismus" has been criticised as it implies a psychogenic cause. In the most widely accepted classification systems (ICD-11 and Rome-IV), the term "dyssynergic defecation" is preferred. As stated in the Rome II criteria, the term "dyssynergic defecation" is preferred to "pelvic floor dyssynergia" because many patients with dyssynergic defecation do not report sexual or urinary symptoms, meaning that only the defecation mechanism is affected.

Other synonyms include:

- Dyskinetic puborectalis
- Puborectalis syndrome
- Paradoxical puborectalis
- Nonrelaxing puborectalis
- Paradoxal puborectal contraction
- Spastic pelvic floor syndrome,
- Anal sphincter dyssynergia
- Paradoxical pelvic floor contraction

== See also ==
- Defecation postures
- Dystonia
- Parcopresis
- Obstructed defecation syndrome
