= Functional abdominal pain syndrome =

- Other names: Centrally mediated abdominal pain syndrome (CMAP), chronic functional abdominal pain (CFAP)
- Specialty: Gastroenterology

Functional abdominal pain syndrome (FAPS), chronic functional abdominal pain (CFAP), or centrally mediated abdominal pain syndrome (CMAP) is a pain syndrome of the abdomen, that has been present for at least six months, is not well connected to gastrointestinal function, and is accompanied by some loss of everyday activities. The discomfort is persistent, near-constant, or regularly reoccurring. The absence of symptom association with food intake or defecation distinguishes functional abdominal pain syndrome from other functional gastrointestinal illnesses, such as irritable bowel syndrome (IBS) and functional dyspepsia.

Functional abdominal pain syndrome is a functional gastrointestinal disorder meaning that it is not associated with any organic or structural pathology. Theories on the mechanisms behind functional abdominal pain syndrome include changes in descending modulation, central sensitization of the spinal dorsal horn, peripheral enhancement of the visceral pain afferent signal, and, central amplification.

The diagnosis of functional abdominal pain syndrome is made based on clinical features and diagnostic criteria. A thorough clinical history must be taken to accurately diagnose functional abdominal pain syndrome. Diagnostic testing to rule out organic disorders should only be done when alarm features are present. Differential diagnosis of functional abdominal pain syndrome includes a variety of other functional gastrointestinal disorders.

There is no well-established treatment for functional abdominal pain syndrome. General measures such as a positive physician-patient relationship are beneficial. Antidepressants are often used to treat other functional gastrointestinal disorders and may be helpful in treating functional abdominal pain syndrome. Psychological interventions including various forms of therapy can also be helpful. While the exact presence of functional abdominal pain syndrome is unknown studies show that it affects between 0.5% and 2% of North Americans. Functional abdominal pain syndrome is more common in women than men and usually occurs in the fourth decade of life.

== Signs and symptoms ==
Functional abdominal pain syndrome is characterized by frequent or chronic stomach pain and a reduction in everyday activity. The pain is persistent, near-constant, or regularly reoccurring. The pain is not related to food intake or defecation. Functional abdominal pain is usually periumbilical and is not accompanied by weight loss, vomiting, diarrhea, nocturnal symptoms, or slowed growth. Typically, the level of abdominal pain in functional abdominal pain syndrome seldom varies, with maximum pain being felt the majority of the time. functional abdominal pain syndrome is frequently coupled with a proclivity to experience and report additional somatic symptoms of discomfort, such as chronic pain believed to be connected to the gynecological or urinary systems.

== Causes ==
Functional abdominal pain syndrome is a functional gastrointestinal disorder. Functional gastrointestinal disorders (FGD) are common medical conditions characterized by recurrent and persistent gastrointestinal symptoms caused by improper functioning of the enteric system in the absence of any identifiable organic or structural pathology, such as ulcers, inflammation, tumors or masses.

== Mechanism ==
The pain from functional abdominal pain syndrome is thought to be caused by changes in descending modulation, central sensitization of the spinal dorsal horn, peripheral enhancement of the visceral pain afferent signal, and, lastly, central amplification.

Peripheral sensitization, also known as elevated ascending visceral afferent signalling, can happen following GI tract inflammation or damage. For example, about one-third of individuals with IBS report that their symptoms started after an acute infection episode; this is a phenomenon known as postinfectious IBS (PI-IBS). PI-IBS has consistently been linked to the existence of a low-grade inflammatory infiltrate. According to theory, this inflammatory infiltration results in increased sensitivity and field of peripheral receptors, the latter of which causes hyperalgesia by recruiting and activating nociceptors that were previously silent. Furthermore, it was discovered that the best indicators of who would develop PI-IBS were stress, as measured by traumatic life events, and a neurotic personality features. These convergent lines of data support the hypothesis that inflammation and/or injury in a psychologically predisposed person may cause visceral afferents to become peripherally sensitized, increasing the amount of nociceptive information that ascends to the spinal dorsal horn.

Peripheral nociceptors become more sensitive, which increases the amount of impulses that reach the spinal dorsal horn. Central sensitization may result from an increase in the frequency and amplitude of peripheral signals that reach the spinal dorsal horn. An increase in presynaptic glutamate release causes central sensitization by removing the magnesium ion block of the N-methyl-d-aspartate (NMDA) receptor. The result is an overall increase in dorsal horn neuron responsiveness, which frequently lasts longer than the initial shock when combined with the activation of other important enzymes.

The anterior cingulate cortex is home to the majority of the central descending modulatory systems. These modulatory systems allow afferent signals from the periphery to be gated, which allows for the amplification or even restriction of the signal. They interface with the spinal dorsal horn. The pro-nociceptive condition that characterizes many chronic visceral pain syndromes is thought to be mostly caused by anomalies in the descending pain modulatory system.

== Diagnosis ==
Since pain is the primary symptom of functional abdominal pain syndrome, obtaining a complete medical history and conducting a comprehensive physical examination continue to be essential components of the diagnosing process. The functional abdominal pain syndrome patient should be asked to provide a thorough history that thoroughly examines the timeline of pain occurrences, especially in connection with surgery, infection, or traumatic life events.

In a patient with functional abdominal pain syndrome, the clinical examination should be normal by definition. Nonetheless, as a starting point, it is important to look closely for the existence of abdominal scars from prior operations or investigations. Similarly, Carnett's sign, which involves palpating a sore spot both before and after the patient tenses their abdominal wall, could be helpful.

Diagnostic testing to rule out organic disease should not be done frequently in the absence of alarm signs, similar to other functional GI problems (i.e., unexplained weight loss, bloody bowel movements, abdominal mass, anorexia). If the physical examination yields negative results, no more diagnostic testing is necessary.

The Rome IV diagnostic criteria for functional abdominal pain syndrome is as follows:

1. Constant or almost constant abdominal pain.
2. There is either no correlation or a very weak one between pain and physiological processes (e.g., eating, feces or menses). (Note: Some degree of gastrointestinal dysfunction may be present)
3. Some aspects of daily functioning are limited by pain. (Note: Daily function could include impairments in work, intimacy, social/leisure, family life, and caregiving for self or others)
4. Pain is not feigned.
5. No other medical illness or structural or functional gastrointestinal issue may account for the pain.

To fit the Rome IV diagnostic criteria for functional abdominal pain syndrome the patient must fit all of the above criteria and the criteria must be met over the past three months, with the onset of symptoms occurring at least six months before diagnosis.

When diagnosing functional abdominal pain syndrome, a number of other functional GI illnesses should be taken into account initially. IBS may be taken into consideration if the pain is accompanied by changes in bowel motions (frequent, loose stools or harder, infrequent stools). Functional gall bladder disease or sphincter of Oddi dysfunction should be considered if the pain is significant, occurs at different intervals (not daily), and is located in the right upper quadrant or epigastrium. Consider functional dyspepsia if the discomfort is in the epigastrium and does not meet the criteria for functional gallbladder disease.

== Treatment ==
There is no definite agreement on how to best manage functional abdominal pain syndrome in adults. As a result, the majority of currently employed therapies are founded on data and firsthand knowledge from other functional bowel diseases and chronic pain syndromes. It is helpful to categorize therapy modalities into three groups: psychological interventions, pharmaceutical therapies, and general measures.

The doctor-patient interaction is essential to the management of a patient with functional abdominal pain syndrome and to a successful outcome. A crucial component of treatment is, in particular, validating a patient's symptoms in a caring, interdisciplinary setting. In the framework of routine outpatient reviews, the patient and the doctor should also decide on and establish realistic treatment goals.

Antidepressants, especially low-dose tricyclic antidepressants (TCAs), have been shown to be beneficial in the treatment of functional gastrointestinal disorders and chronic pain. They may also be helpful in the treatment of functional abdominal pain syndrome due to their dual effects of direct pain management and antidepressant properties.

Trials utilizing tricyclic antidepressants have generally outperformed those using selective serotonin-reuptake inhibitors in other chronic pain disorders. Venlafaxine and duloxetine are two examples of more recent medications with combined serotonin and norepinephrine reuptake inhibitors (SNRIs), which have been shown to reduce pain in some somatic pain disorders and may be helpful in functional abdominal pain syndrome. Patients with co-occurring anxiety and depression may benefit from both SNRIs and selective serotonin-reuptake inhibitors (SSRIs). The majority of analgesics, such as aspirin and nonsteroidal anti-inflammatory medications, don't really help much, maybe because they mostly have peripheral effects. Because of the risk of addiction and narcotic bowel syndrome, narcotic analgesics should be avoided.

There hasn't been a study explicitly looking at adult functional abdominal pain syndrome and psychological therapy. Studies on non-gastrointestinal pain diseases and other painful functional gastrointestinal illnesses, however, point to the potential benefit of psychological therapies. Stress management, hypnosis, dynamic or interpersonal psychotherapy, and cognitive behavioral therapy are among the interventions that may prove advantageous. The most effective way to manage impairment resulting from refractory chronic pain may be to refer patients to pain treatment clinics for multidisciplinary treatment programs. While the previously discussed psychological treatments have demonstrated improvements in mood, coping, quality of life, and health care costs, their effect on specific visceral or somatic symptoms is less clear, indicating that their most effective application may be in conjunction with symptomatic treatment.

== Epidemiology ==
Due to a lack of data and methodological challenges in distinguishing functional abdominal pain syndrome from other more prevalent functional gastrointestinal diseases like IBS and functional dyspepsia, the epidemiology of the disease is not fully understood. Nonetheless, compared to functional dyspepsia or IBS, functional abdominal pain syndrome is generally thought to be a less frequent. The stated prevalence rates in North America are between 0.5% and 2%, and they are consistent with reports from other nations. The condition affects women more frequently than men (3:2), with a peak in prevalence occurring in the fourth decade of life.
