= C19H24N2OS =

The molecular formula C_{19}H_{24}N_{2}OS (molar mass: 328.47 g/mol, exact mass: 328.1609 u) may refer to:

- Levomepromazine, also known as methotrimeprazine
