= Bristol stool scale =

Medical system for classifying human faeces

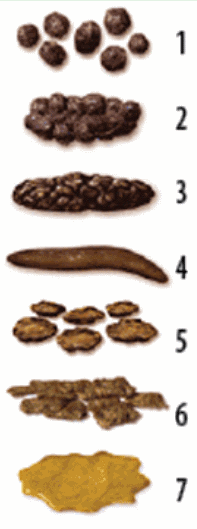
- Bristol stool chart
- Synonyms: Bristol stool chart (BSC); Bristol Stool Scale (BSS); Bristol Stool Form Scale (BSFS or BSF scale)
- Purpose: classify type of feces (diagnostic triad for irritable bowel syndrome)

The Bristol stool scale is a diagnostic medical tool designed to classify the form of human faeces into seven categories. It is used in both clinical and experimental fields.

It was developed at the Bristol Royal Infirmary as a clinical assessment tool in 1997, by Stephen Lewis and Ken Heaton and is widely used as a research tool to evaluate the effectiveness of treatments for various diseases of the bowel, as well as a clinical communication aid; including being part of the diagnostic triad for irritable bowel syndrome.

== Interpretation ==
The seven types of stool are:

- Type 1: Separate hard lumps, like nuts (difficult to pass)
- Type 2: Sausage-shaped, but lumpy
- Type 3: Like a sausage but with cracks on its surface
- Type 4: Like a sausage or snake, smooth and soft (average stool)
- Type 5: Soft blobs with clear cut edges
- Type 6: Fluffy pieces with ragged edges, a mushy stool (diarrhoea)
- Type 7: Watery, no solid pieces, entirely liquid (diarrhoea)

Types 1 and 2 indicate constipation, with 3 and 4 being the ideal stools as they are easy to defecate while not containing excess liquid, and 6 and 7 indicate diarrhoea. Some media describe type 4 as "ghost poop" or "perfect poop".

In the initial study, in the population examined in this scale, the type 1 and 2 stools were more prevalent in females, while the type 5 and 6 stools were more prevalent in males; furthermore, 80% of subjects who reported rectal tenesmus (sensation of incomplete defecation) had type 7. These and other data have allowed the scale to be validated. The initial research did not include a pictorial chart with this being developed at a later point.

The Bristol stool scale is also very sensitive to changes in intestinal transit time caused by medications, such as antidiarrhoeal loperamide, senna, or anthraquinone with laxative effect.

== Uses ==
=== Diagnosis of irritable bowel syndrome ===
People with irritable bowel syndrome (IBS) typically report that they suffer with abdominal cramps and constipation. In some patients, chronic constipation is interspersed with brief episodes of diarrhoea; while a minority of patients with IBS have only diarrhoea. The presentation of symptoms is usually months or years and commonly patients consult different doctors, without great success, and doing various specialized investigations. It notices a strong correlation of the reported symptoms with stress; indeed diarrhoeal discharges are associated with emotional phenomena. IBS blood is present only if the disease is associated with haemorrhoids.

Research conducted on irritable bowel syndrome in the 2000s, faecal incontinence and the gastrointestinal complications of HIV have used the Bristol scale as a diagnostic tool easy to use, even in research which lasted for 77 months.

Historically, this scale of assessment of the faeces has been recommended by the consensus group of Kaiser Permanente Medical Care Program (San Diego, California, US) for the collection of data on functional bowel disease (FBD).

More recently, according to the latest revision of the Rome III Criteria, six clinical manifestations of IBS can be identified:

Subtypes prevalent presentation of stool in IBS according to the Rome III Criteria
1. IBS with constipation (IBS-C) – lumpy or hard stools * ≥ 25% and loose (soft) or watery stools † <25% of bowel movements. ‡
2. IBS with diarrhea (IBS-D) – loose (soft) or watery stools † ≥ 25% and lumpy or hard stools * <25% of bowel movements. ‡
3. Mixed IBS (IBS - M) – lumpy or hard stools * ≥ 25% and loose (soft) or watery stools † ≥ 25% of bowel movements. ‡
4. Untyped IBS (IBS - U) – insufficient stool abnormalities to be IBS-C, D or M ‡
* Bristol stool scale type 1–2 (Separate hard lumps like nuts or sausage-shaped);
† Bristol stool scale type 6–7 (fluffy pieces with ragged edges, soft or watery, no solid or completely liquid pieces);
‡ In the absence of the use of antidiarrhoeal or laxative.

These four identified subtypes correlate with the consistency of the stool, which can be determined by the Bristol stool scale.

In 2007, the Mayo Clinic College of Medicine in Rochester, Minnesota, United States, reported a piece of epidemiological research conducted on a population of 4,196 people living in Olmsted County Minnesota, in which participants were asked to complete a questionnaire based on the Bristol stool scale.

Distribution of risk factors in three groups classified according to the colonic transit and subgroups classified according to the type of feces model century
| | Normal colonic transit (BSS 3–4) (n=1662) | Slow colonic transit (BSS 1–2) (n=411) | Fast colonic transit (BSS 5–7) (n=197) |
|---|---|---|---|
| Age (mean ± s.d.; years) | 62 ± 12 | 63 ± 13 | 61 ± 12 |
| Male (%) | 50 | 38 | 43 |
| BMI (mean ± s.d.) | 29.6 ± 7.5 | 28.2 ± 6.8 | 32.5 ± 9.9 |
| SSC score (mean ± s.d.) (Somatic Symptom Checklist) | 1.6 ± 0,50 | 1.7 ± 0.53 | 1.8 ± 0.57 |
| Smoking (%) | 8 | 7 | 12 |
| Alcohol (%) | 45 | 48 | 41 |
| Cholecystectomy (%) | 11 | 12 | 19 |
| Appendectomy (%) | 28 | 31 | 35 |
| Birth control pills (% women) | 3 | 5 | 3 |
Marital status
| Married (%) | 80 | 77 | 76 |
School level
| Compulsory education (%) | 5 | 5 | 7 |
| High school/some years (%) | 53 | 52 | 58 |
| Diploma or university (%) | 41 | 42 | 36 |
Family history
| Gastric cancer (%) | 16 | 14 | 15 |
| Bowel cancer (%) | 12 | 11 | 15 |

The research results (see table) indicate that about 1 in 5 people have a slow transit (type 1 and 2 stools), while 1 in 12 has an accelerated transit (type 5 and 6 stools). Moreover, the nature of the stool is affected by age, sex, body mass index, whether or not they had cholecystectomy and possible psychosomatic components (somatisation); there were no effects from factors such as smoking, alcohol, the level of education, a history of appendectomy or familiarity with gastrointestinal diseases, civil state, or the use of oral contraceptives.

=== Therapeutic evaluation ===
Several investigations correlate the Bristol stool scale in response to medications or therapies, in fact, in one study was also used to titrate the dose more finely than one drug (colestyramine) in subjects with diarrhoea and faecal incontinence.

In a randomised controlled study, the scale was used to study the response to two laxatives: Macrogol (polyethylene glycol) and psyllium (Plantago psyllium and other species of the same genus) of 126 male and female patients for a period of 2 weeks of treatment; failing to show the most rapid response and increased efficiency of the former over the latter. The primary outcomes were the number of weekly bowel movements, stool consistency according to the Bristol stool scale, time to defecation, overall effectiveness, difficulty in defecating, and stool consistency.

From 2010, several studies have used the scale as a diagnostic tool validated for recognition and evaluation of response to various treatments, such as probiotics, moxicombustion, laxatives in the elderly, preparing Ayurvedic poly-phytotherapy filed TLPL/AY, psyllium, mesalazine, methylnaltrexone, and oxycodone/naloxone, or to assess the response to physical activity in athletes.

== History ==
Developed and proposed for the first time in England by Stephen Lewis and Ken Heaton at the University Department of Medicine, Bristol Royal Infirmary, it was suggested by the authors as a clinical assessment tool in 1997 in the Scandinavian Journal of Gastroenterology after a previous prospective study, conducted in 1992 on a sample of the population (838 men and 1,059 women), had shown an unexpected prevalence of defecation disorders related to the shape and type of stool. The authors of the former paper concluded that the form of the stool is a useful surrogate measure of colon transit time. That conclusion has since been challenged as having limited validity for Types 1 and 2; however, it remains in use as a research tool to evaluate the effectiveness of treatments for various diseases of the bowel, as well as a clinical communication aid.

=== Versions ===
The same scale has been validated in Spanish, Brazilian Portuguese, and Polish versions. A version has also been designed and validated for children. More recently, in September 2011, a modified version of the scale was validated using a criterion of self-assessment for ages six–eight years of age.

A version of the scale was developed into a chart suitable for use on US television by Gary Kahan of NewYork–Presbyterian Hospital.

== Bibliography ==
- Borgelt LM, O'Connell MB, Smith JA, Calis KA (2010). Women's Health Across the Lifespan: A Pharmacotherapeutic Approach. ASHP. pp. 513–. ISBN 978-1-58528-194-7.
- Greenberger NJ, Blumberg R, Burakoff R, eds. (23 April 2009). Current Diagnosis and Treatment in Gastroenterology, Hepatology, and Endoscopy. McGraw Hill Professional. pp. 282–. ISBN 978-0-07-149007-8.
- South-Paul JE, Matheny SC, Lewis EL (4 September 2007). Current Diagnosis & Treatment in Family Medicine (Second ed.). McGraw-Hill Companies. ISBN 978-0-07-146153-5.
- Potts JM, ed. (2008). Genitourinary Pain and Inflammation: Diagnosis and Management. Springer. pp. 121–. ISBN 978-1-58829-816-4.
- Zderic S, Kirk J (15 September 2008). Pediatric Urology for the Primary Care Provider. Thoroughfare, NJ: SLACK Incorporated. pp. 22–. ISBN 978-1-55642-785-5.
