= Kenneth Willoughby Heaton =

British physician (1936–2013)

- Born: 3 August 1936; Shillong, Assam, British India
- Died: 4 March 2013 (aged 76)
- Education: Marlborough College
- Alma mater: University of Cambridge
- Occupation: Physician
- Known for: Developing irritable bowel syndrome diagnostic criteria and the Bristol stool scale
- Spouse: Susan O'Connor (m. 1961)

Kenneth Willoughby Heaton (3 August 1936 – 4 March 2013) was a British physician who was an expert in intestinal diseases. He defined a set of criteria that could be used to diagnose irritable bowel syndrome based on a person's symptoms, and he developed the Bristol stool scale.

== Life and career ==
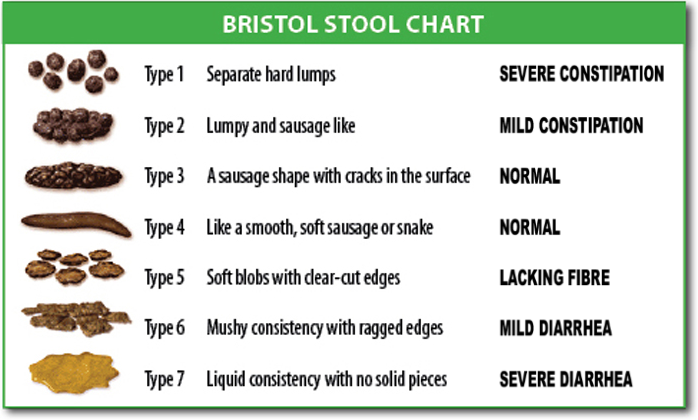
The Bristol stool chart, developed by Heaton

Heaton was born in 1936 in Shillong, India, where his parents were Christian missionaries. His family later moved to England, where Heaton attended Marlborough College before completing a Bachelor of Arts at the University of Cambridge. He went on to study medicine at Cambridge, with clinical placements in London at Middlesex Hospital and Central Middlesex Hospital. He married Susan O'Connor, a fellow medical student, in 1961, the year they both graduated.

Heaton was a medical registrar at the Royal Free Hospital and the Bristol Royal Infirmary. During a year-long research fellowship at Duke University Medical Center in the United States, he developed an interest in bile salts; he later wrote a book titled Bile Salts in Health and Disease. He subscribed to the "Cleave hypothesis", first posed by Peter Cleave, that a number of diseases were due to the consumption of excessive processed foods to which the human gastrointestinal tract had not adapted. This influenced his research on irritable bowel syndrome (IBS), and in 1978 he co-authored a paper positing that a diagnosis of IBS could be made on the basis of symptoms alone. His research led to the development of the Rome criteria for diagnosis of functional gastrointestinal disorders including IBS.

From 1968, Heaton worked as a consultant at the Bristol Royal Infirmary and as a lecturer (and eventually reader) in medicine at the University of Bristol. With Steve Lewis, he developed the Bristol stool scale, an illustrated scale of faecal consistency that reflects intestinal transit time and can be used to assess bowel health and is used internationally by clinicians and researchers.
