= Abdominal migraine =

Migraine Disorder

- Specialty: Neurology
- Symptoms: Episodes of abdominal pain
- Usual onset: Childhood
- Risk factors: Cyclic vomiting syndrome, PTSD, functional gastrointestinal disorder
- Diagnostic method: Symptoms
- Differential diagnosis: Irritable bowel syndrome, peptic ulcer disease, gastroesophageal reflux disease, mast cell activation syndrome, celiac artery compression syndrome
- Prevention: Avoiding triggers
- Treatment: TCAs, anticonvulsants
- Prognosis: Good (kids), variable (adults)
- Frequency: 1% to 9% (kids)

Abdominal migraine (AM) is a functional disorder that usually occurs in childhood, without a clear pathologic mechanism or biochemical irregularity. Children frequently experience sporadic episodes of excruciating central abdominal pain accompanied by migrainous symptoms like nausea, vomiting, severe headaches, and general pallor. Abdominal migraine can be diagnosed based on clinical criteria and the exclusion of other disorders.

There are no specific medications for the condition. The goal is usually to prevent attacks, through nonpharmacologic intervention.

Abdominal migraines affects about 0.4% to 4% of children. It occurs most commonly in those aged 3 to 10 years, with females more commonly affected.

== Signs and symptoms ==
Midline abdominal pain with paroxysmal, recurrent, acute onset attacks that last an average of 17 hours are the hallmarks of abdominal migraine. There have been reports that these attacks can last anywhere from two to seventy-two hours. Although it has also been reported to be diffuse and colicky, the pain is usually described as dull and periumbilical. 91% of patients have anorexia, 73% to 91% have nausea, 35% to 50% vomit, and 93% to 100% of patients have associated pallor. The attack usually comes to an abrupt end. The average annual frequency of abdominal migraine attacks in patients is 14.

Although nonspecific prodromes can occur before attacks, abdominal migraine attacks are usually sporadic. This can include behavioral and mood swings, anorexia, flushing, diarrhea, and auras that include numbness, slurred speech, tingling in the distal extremities, and flashing lights. Weeks to months may pass between episodes, and during this time patients usually experience no symptoms.

== Causes ==
Abdominal migraine has been linked to specific alterations in the gut-brain axis, vascular dysregulation, modifications in the central nervous system, and genetic factors.

=== Risk factors ===
Abdominal migraine pathophysiology may involve psychological factors. Abuse and stressful events are two risk factors for recurrent abdominal pain, for instance. Furthermore, it has been demonstrated that kids with functional gastrointestinal disorders experience mental health conditions like anxiety and depression more frequently than kids without these conditions.

=== Triggers ===
There are several typical causes of attacks of abdominal migraines. Stressors related to work and family life, irregular sleep patterns, extended fasts and food deprivation, dehydration, exercise, travel, high-amine foods, foods containing flavoring, coloring, and monosodium glutamate (MSG), and flashing lights are a few common triggers.

=== Genetics ===
A significant hereditary component may be involved in abdominal and other migraines due to their strong familial incidence, especially in the case of mutations affecting cell membrane transport (channelopathies).

== Mechanism ==
While the pathophysiology of functional gastrointestinal disorders (FGIDs) has many potential contributors, the etiology of abdominal migraine is still unknown.

It is thought that abnormal electrical discharge from the hypothalamus that travels to the cortex and autonomic nervous system or variations in the cerebral artery's blood flow velocity cause attacks. In patients with FGIDs, there appears to be a disruption in the complex brain-gut axis. Many episodic functional gastrointestinal disorders in childhood have been linked to mitochondrial disease, hypothalamic-pituitary-axis dysfunction, and gene mutations; these associations have not, however, been studied in patients diagnosed with abdominal migraine.

== Diagnosis ==
It is critical to rule out organic diseases as the source of a child's symptoms while also taking the patient's functional state into account. When diagnosing abdominal migraine, a patient's complete medical history and physical examination are crucial. Additionally, any potential alarm signs and symptoms should be carefully examined. The presence of visible or occult blood in the stool, dysphagia, hematemesis, bilious vomiting, fever, changes in growth pattern, and weight loss are a few examples of alarm symptoms. Further imaging and testing should be carried out if these alarm signs or symptoms are apparent.

The Rome IV criteria state that paroxysmal bouts of intense, acute periumbilical, midline, or diffuse abdominal pain lasting at least an hour, exhibiting a recurrent pattern, being incapacitating, and interfering with regular activities can be used to diagnose abdominal migraine if at least two of these episodes take place over a six-month period. There should be weeks or months without any symptoms in between attacks. The following symptoms must be present in at least two instances: pallor, photophobia, headache, nausea, vomiting, and anorexia. Lastly, there is no other medical diagnosis that can account for the symptoms.

Abdominal migraine is defined by the International Classification of Headache Disorders III criteria as five or more episodes of abdominal pain lasting two to seventy-two hours. A minimum of two out of three of the following criteria must also be met by the pain: dull or "just sore" quality; midline location, periumbilical, or poorly localized; and moderate to severe intensity. Pallor, nausea, vomiting, and anorexia are associated symptoms that the patient should have at least two of.

=== Differential diagnosis ===
Abdominal migraine must be distinguished from other causes of chronic or recurrent abdominal pain, such as irritable bowel syndrome, peptic ulcer disease, and gastroesophageal reflux disease. It must also be distinguished from causes of acute abdominal pain, such as appendicitis, as wrong diagnosis may lead to unnecessary appendectomy.

== Treatment ==
Because there are so few studies in the literature, there are no firm recommendations for the treatment of abdominal migraines. The majority of treatment options are predicated on anecdotal evidence, a small number of studies conducted on a relatively small number of children, and a close correlation between abdominal migraines and both migraine headaches and FGIDs.

When treating patients with abdominal migraines, doctors may find the STRESS mnemonic useful. It stands for stress management, travel advice, rest, emergency symptoms, sparkling lights, and snacks to avoid.

Certain triggers, like bright light, restless nights, travel, and extended fasting, should probably be minimized or avoided once they have been identified. Emotional stressors from family or school activities can be a trigger for certain kids, so it's best to minimize or stay away from them. Although there are no particular randomized trials evaluating the efficacy of biofeedback and counselling in treating abdominal migraines, it is believed that these interventions may be helpful if emotional stress is a trigger factor in the development of migraine in children.

It's unclear what function elimination diets serve. Nonetheless, in patients experiencing both migraine and IBS symptoms, an immunoglobulin G (IgG)-based elimination diet shows promise in lowering migraine episodes. There isn't much more proof that a child's diet has a significant impact on when migraines begin.

In one study, 14 children with abdominal migraine were administered pizotifen syrup, a serotonin and histamine antagonist. After four months, 70% of the patients said their symptoms had improved. Their symptoms were noticeably milder and less frequent. Propranolol and cyproheptadine syrup were found to alleviate symptoms in a retrospective review. Flunarizine use was found to reduce the frequency and duration of abdominal migraine attacks in another retrospective review.

Analgesics, triptans, and antiemetics may be helpful for sudden attacks of abdominal migraines. It has been suggested that patients with nausea, vomiting, or anorexia might benefit more from nasal sprays or suppositories. Acute attacks have been reported to be resolved by acetaminophen and ibuprofen. Intranasal sumatriptan alleviated the symptoms of abdominal migraine in two children, according to a case report. In refractory cases, intravenous sodium valproate has been reported to resolve abdominal migraine episodes. According to a case series, intravenous dihydroergotamine treatment prevented abdominal migraine attacks in five out of six pediatric patients.

== Prognosis ==
Abdominal migraine can have a significant impact on day-to-day life. Children may miss school or other activities. It resolves in many patients.

== Epidemiology ==
Abdominal migraine primarily affects children, for whom it is a common cause of chronic abdominal pain. It may be as high as 9% or as low as 1% among children. It is rare in adults. However, children diagnosed with abdominal migraines may have migraine headaches as adults. The mean age of diagnosis is 7 years. It appears to be slightly more common in women.

== History ==
This condition was first described in 1921 by Buchanan. It was once considered a controversial diagnosis. However, it is now accepted as a common cause of chronic abdominal pain in children.

== See also ==
- Migraine
- Functional gastrointestinal disorder
