= Nick Talley =

Australian gastroenterologist

Nick Talley AC FRACP FRCP FRCPE FAHMS
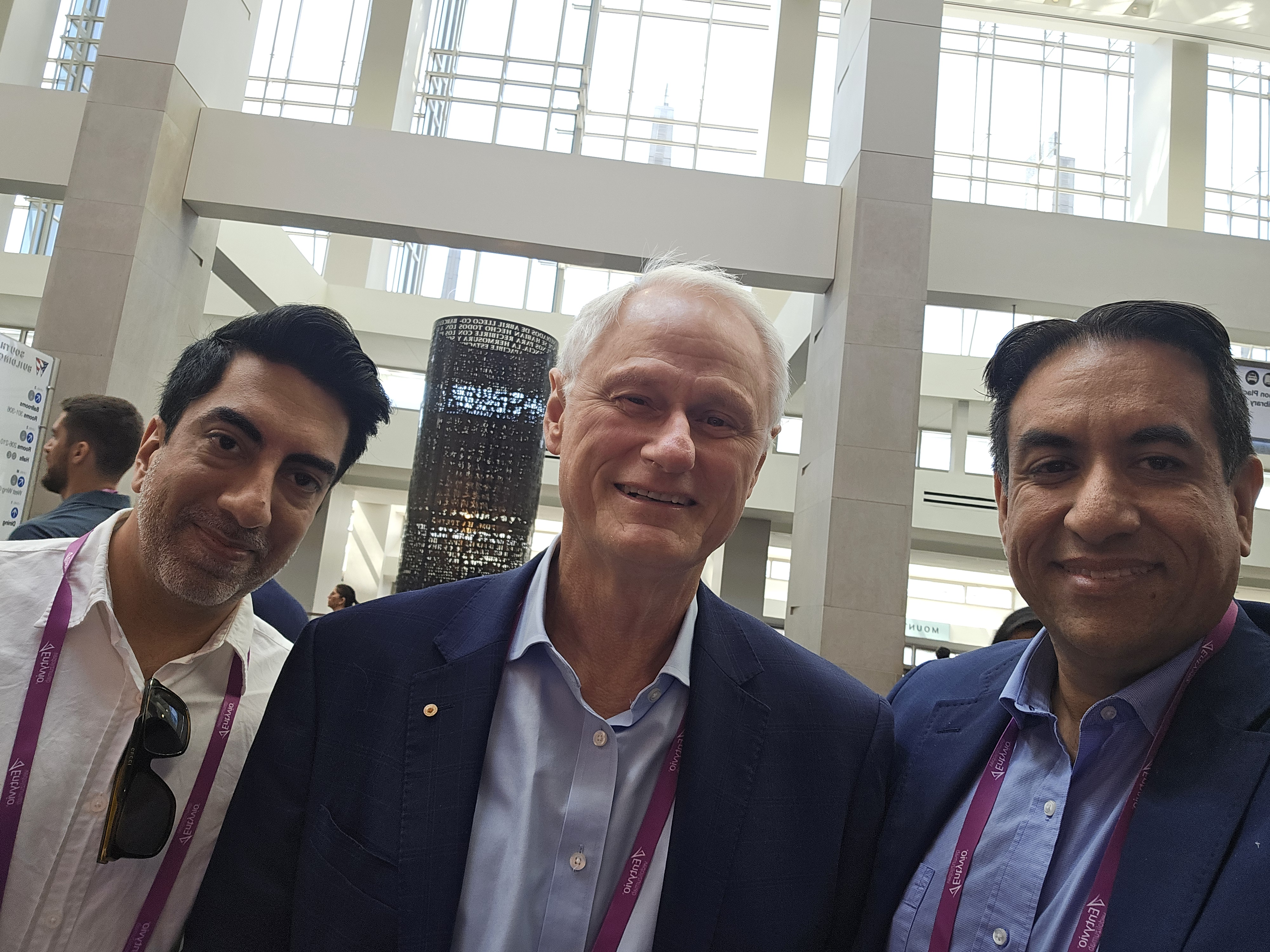
- Education: MBBS, MD University of New South Wales PhD University of Sydney Masters (Epidemiology) University of Newcastle
- Occupations: Physician, Scientist
- Known for: Medical Journal of Australia Editor in Chief
- Awards: Companion of the Order of Australia (AC) (2018) NSW Scientist of the Year Award, Sydney Australia (2018) Research Australia - Peter Wills Medal, Sydney Australia (2018) NSW Science and Engineering Awards - Excellence in Biological Sciences Office of the NSW Chief Scientist and Engineer (2014) Distinguished Educator Award - American Gastroenterological Association (2014)

Nicholas Talley is an Australian neurogastroenterologist, clinician and educator with a research interest in disorders of gut-brain interactions, intestinal inflammation including eosinophilic gastrointestinal disorders and the microbiome. Talley currently serves as Head, Discipline of Medicine at the University of Newcastle, Australia. He is also Chief Investigator, NHMRC Centre for Research Excellence in Transforming Gut Health and an NHMRC Leadership Fellow. He currently works as Senior Staff Specialist at John Hunter Hospital, Newcastle, Australia. He has over 1000 peer-review publications, is highly cited (>150,000 cites, H-index 202, Google Scholar) and considered an international authority in the field.

== Early life ==
Talley grew up in Sydney, Australia. He is a first-generation Australian and the son of a Hungarian gastroenterologist, also known as Nicholas Talley.

== Education and training ==
After completing school at St. Aloysius College, Sydney, Talley studied medicine at the University of New South Wales, graduating in 1979 with honours. He subsequently completed his PhD from the University of Sydney, MD from the University of New South Wales, and Masters of Medical Science (Clinical Epidemiology) from the University of Newcastle, Australia. Talley completed Basic Physician Training at the Prince of Wales Hospital in Sydney, Advanced Training in Gastroenterology at the Royal North Shore Hospital in Sydney, and postdoctoral research at Mayo Clinic in the Gastroenterology Research Unit and Division of Gastroenterology and Hepatology in Rochester, Minnesota. Talley received a National Health and Medical Research Council scholarship in 1984.

== Professional career ==
In 1988, Talley was appointed to the consultant staff at Mayo Clinic in Minnesota. In 1993, Talley returned to Australia to become the Foundation Professor of Medicine at Nepean Hospital in Sydney. In 2002, Talley returned to the Mayo Clinic in Minnesota to become the Co-Director of the Center for Enteric Neurosciences Translational and Epidemiological Research Program. During this time at the Mayo Clinic, Talley also served as a professor of medicine. In 2006, he also became a professor of epidemiology. In 2007, Talley was appointed the Chairman of Medicine at the Mayo Clinic campus in Jacksonville, Florida.

In 2010, Talley returned to Australia to become Pro Vice Chancellor, Faculty of Health and Medicine at the University of Newcastle in Newcastle, New South Wales. From 2013 -14 Talley served as Acting Deputy Vice-Chancellor, Research and Innovation, at the same university. . From 2015 - 2019, Talley was appointed Pro Vice Chancellor, Global Research.

He held an invited prestigious Foreign Guest Professorial appointment at the Karolinska Institute for the maximum term of six years, until 2016.

In 2012, Talley was elected President-Elect of the Royal Australasian College of Physicians by his peers and served his term as President from May 2014 to 2016. During his leadership, he launched the campaign Doctors For Climate Action. He remains a climate action advocate, serving as Board Chair for Doctors for the Environment Australia (DEA) until early 2026. He was elected Chair of the Council of Presidents of Medical Colleges (CPMC) in 2015 and completed his term leading all of the Colleges in 2017. He served on the NHMRC Research Committee for two terms and currently serves on the NHMRC Council. He was a member of the MBS Taskforce Review. In June 2014 he was inaugurated as one of the first 15 Fellows of the Australian Academy of Health and Medical Sciences (FAHMS) and was elected to the Executive of the Academy, where he served as Honorary Treasurer from 2014-2017.

Holding an appointment as Senior Staff Specialist at the John Hunter Hospital, a tertiary referral teaching hospital in Newcastle, Talley remains an actively practising part-time consultant gastroenterologist and Distinguished Laureate Professor at the University of Newcastle, Australia. He also serves as Adjunct Professor for the University of North Carolina.

He was awarded an NHMRC Level 3 Investigator Grant in 2020, and again in 2024, and is Chief Investigator on a NHMRC Centre of Research Excellence (Centre of Research Excellence in Transforming Gut Health - previously Centre of Research Excellence in Digestive Health) since 2019. From 2026 - 2027, Talley is a Visiting Professor at Imperial College London.

== Awards ==
In June 2014 he was inaugurated as one of the first 15 Fellows of the Australian Academies of Health and Medical Sciences (FAHMS) and was elected to the Executive of the Academy, where he served as Honorary Treasurer from 2014-2017. In 2017 he was named “Australia’s most cited Academic” by Google Scholar.

On Australia Day 2018, he was awarded the Companion of the Order of Australia (AC) "For eminent service to medical research, and to education in the field of gastroenterology and epidemiology, as an academic, author and administrator at the national and international level, and to health and scientific associations".

In 2018, he received a further two awards for his work in Science:

- NSW Scientist of the Year Award, Sydney Australia - presented in November 2018 by the NSW Premier.
- Research Australia, Peter Wills Medal, Sydney Australia - presented in November 2018 by Peter Wills himself.

His undergraduate textbook Clinical Examination (now 10th edition) won first place in the British Medical Association Book Awards in 2018.

In 2019 he received the Bruce Shepard Medal from the Australian Doctors Federation- to recognise outstanding contribution to independent medicine and the highest ideals of the Australian medical profession. In 2020 he was also named HMRI's Researcher of the Year.

In 2021 he was awarded a Gold Medal: the Australian Medical Association’s (AMA) highest award, in recognition of outstanding services to medicine.

Talley has been granted the following Research.com awards:

- 2026 - Research.com Medicine in Australia Leader Award
- 2025 - Research.com Best Scientists Award
- 2025 - Research.com Medicine in Australia Leader Award
- 2024 - Research.com ranked 171st in the world and 1st in Australia on the World Online Ranking of Best Medicine Scientists
- 2023 - Research.com Medicine in Australia Leader Award
- 2022 - Research.com Medicine in Australia Leader Award

== Research ==
Talley and Dr. Simon O'Connor co-authored Clinical Examination, a widely used textbook of physical examination. Talley and O'Connor also wrote the widely acclaimed Examination Medicine for postgraduate trainees.

Talley wrote the textbook Internal Medicine: The Essential Facts. He is also the author of a textbook of gastroenterology, now in its third edition.

He was a member of the Rome Foundation Board for 20 years, a current editor for Up To Date, and past Editor-in-Chief of the American Journal of Gastroenterology and Alimentary Pharmacology and Therapeutics. From 2015–2023 he was the Editor-in-Chief (now Emeritus) of the Medical Journal of Australia (MJA). He was elected to the Board of the Asia Pacific Association of Medical Editors (APAME) in 2018 and President from 2023 - 2026.

== Publications ==
Talley and Dr. Simon O'Connor co-authored Clinical Examination, a widely used textbook of physical examination. Talley and O'Connor wrote this book because many of the existing textbooks omitted useful clinical examination techniques. Talley and O'Connor also wrote the widely acclaimed Examination Medicine for postgraduate trainees.

Talley wrote the textbook Internal Medicine: The Essential Facts. He is also the author of a textbook of gastroenterology, now in its third edition.

Talley has a career total of 2,013 journal articles, 534 abstract/presentation at a conference, 22 books*, 34 book chapters and 9 preprints.
