= Samuel Gee =

English physician and paediatrician

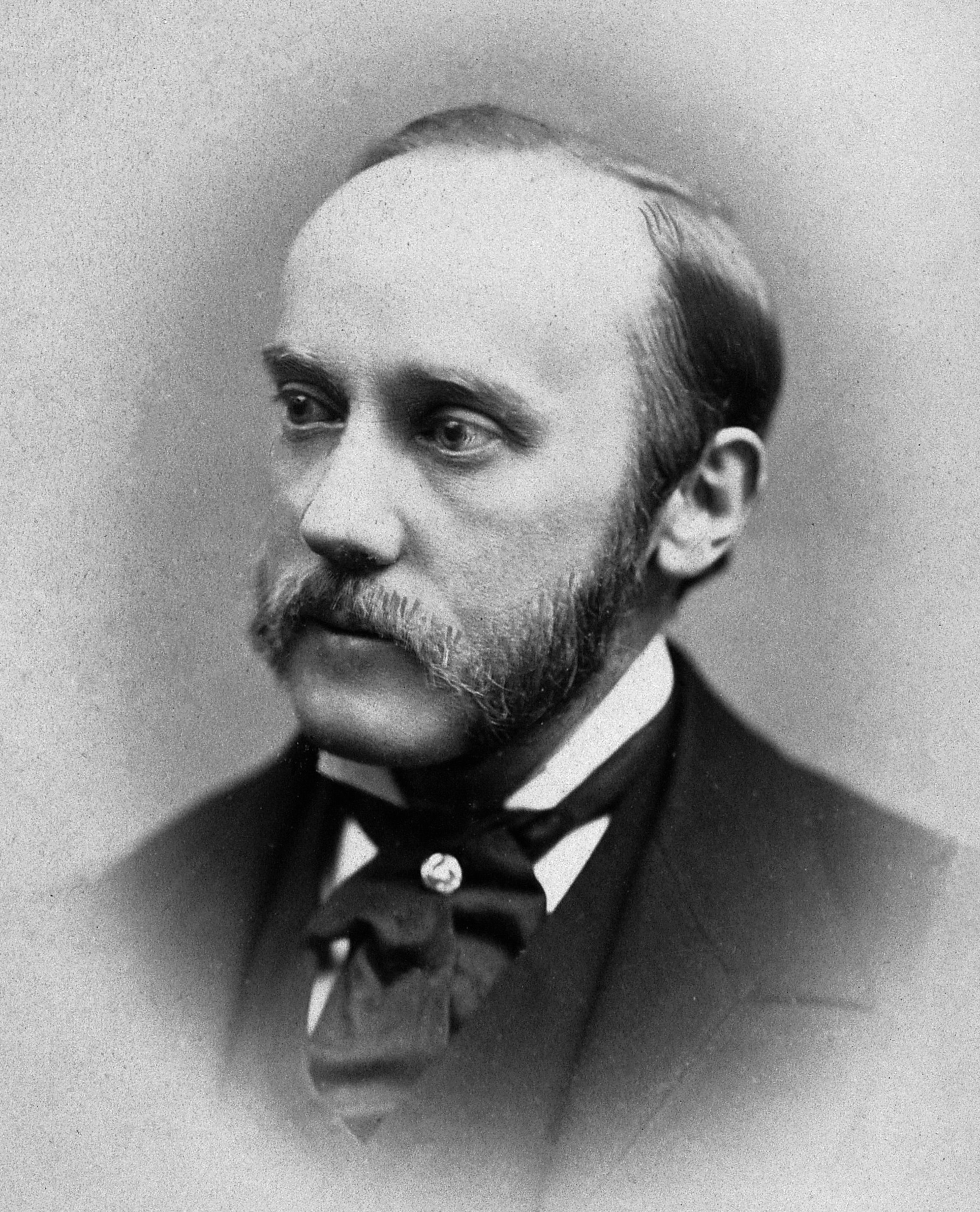
Samuel Jones Gee in 1881

Samuel Jones Gee (13 September 1839 – 3 August 1911) was an English physician and paediatrician. In 1888, Gee published the first complete modern description of the clinical picture of coeliac disease, and theorised on the importance of diet in its control. His contribution led to the eponym Gee's disease. Gee is also credited with the first English-language description of cyclic vomiting syndrome.

== Life ==
Samuel Gee was born in London, where he spent his medical career. His father, William Gee, was a businessman but the family was not wealthy. He had two years of formal primary education, supplemented by home schooling. His secondary education was at the University College School, London. He went on to study medicine at the University College Hospital, gaining an MB in 1861 followed by an MD in 1865.

Gee initially worked as a house surgeon at the University College Hospital. He moved to the Hospital for Sick Children, Great Ormond Street in 1865. His career progressed through house surgeon, assistant physician (1866), physician (1875) and finally consulting physician (1904). He worked at Great Ormond Street Hospital, at St Bartholomew's Hospital and in private practice. At St Bartholomew's medical school, he was a demonstrator of morbid anatomy, lecturer on pathological anatomy and lecturer on medicine. He delivered the 1871 Goulstonian, the 1892 Bradshaw and the 1899 Lumleian Lectures.

Gee was married to Sarah Cooper in 1875 with whom he had two daughters. He died suddenly, of a coronary occlusion, while on holiday in Keswick, Cumbria.

== Coeliac disease ==
Gee gave the first modern-day description of coeliac disease in a lecture at the Hospital for Sick Children, Great Ormond Street in 1887. His interest in the history of medicine, and ability to read ancient Greek, meant Gee was familiar with the work of Aretaeus of Cappadocia who first wrote of "The Cœliac Affection". Gee's account is published in the St. Bartholomew's Hospital Reports of 1888 and begins:

There is a kind of chronic indigestion which is met with in persons of all ages, yet is especially apt to affect children between one a five years old. Signs of the disease are yielded by the fæces; being loose, not formed, but not watery; more bulky than the food taken would seem to account for; pale in colour, as if devoid of bile; yeasty, frothy, an appearance probably due to fermentation; stinking, stench often very great, the food having undergone putrefaction rather than concoction.

Gee acknowledges earlier findings and terms for the disease and adopts the same term as Aretaeus. Unlike Aretaeus, he includes children in the scope of the affection, particularly those between one and five years old. He notes that most adults with the cœliac affection have been abroad. Gee finds the cause to be obscure and fails to spot anything abnormal during post-mortem examination. He perceptively states "if the patient can be cured at all, it must be by means of diet." Gee recognises that milk intolerance is a problem with coeliac children and that highly starched foods should be avoided. He forbids rice, sago, fruit and vegetables. Raw meat is recommended as are thin slices of toasted bread. Gee highlights particular success with a child "who was fed upon a quart of the best Dutch mussels daily". However, the child cannot bear this diet for more than one season.

The cause of coeliac disease was eventually discovered to be an autoimmune reaction to gliadin, a gluten protein found in wheat, plus Secalin in rye and Hordien in barley. The lining of the small bowel is flattened, which interferes with the absorption of nutrients. Gee would not have been able to discover this on post-mortem since this lining quickly deteriorates on death. The only effective treatment is a lifelong gluten-free diet. The rice, sago, fruit and vegetables that were forbidden by Gee would all have been quite safe to eat; the toasted bread he recommended, however, would not. The disease he describes in adults, affecting those returning from India and other foreign parts, is likely to have been tropical sprue. For many years this was inadequately distinguished from coeliac disease, which was also known as non-tropical sprue.

== Achievements ==
- 1866: Elected Resident Fellow of the Royal Medical and Chirurgical Society. He was the society's librarian from 1877 to 1899.
- 1870: Elected Fellow of the Royal College of Physicians. He was the college's censor from 1893 to 1894 and senior censor in 1897.
- 1901: Appointed physician to George, Prince of Wales.
- The Royal College of Physicians named an annual lecture after him.

== Publications ==
- Articles on chicken pox, scarlet fever and tubercular meningitis in Sir John Russel Reynolds' System of Medicine (vol. I & II, 1866; 1868).
- Auscultation and Percussion together with Other Methods of Physical Examination of the Chest by Samuel Jones Gee. London, 1870; 6th edition, 1906.
- Gee, Samuel. “An Address Delivered at the Opening of the Section of Diseases of Children.” British Medical Journal 2.1179 (1883): 236–238. Print.
- Medical lectures and aphorisms by Samuel Jones Gee. London, 1902; 3rd edition, 1907.
- Forty six papers in St Bartholomew's Hospital Reports.
  - Gee, Samuel, Dr. "On the Coeliac Affection." St. Bartholomew’s Hospital Reports XXIV.B (1888): 17–20. Print.

== Additional sources ==
- Dowd B; Walker-Smith J (1974). "Samuel Gee, Aretaeus, and the coeliac affection". British Medical Journal. 2 (5909): 45–7. doi:10.1136/bmj.2.5909.45. PMC 1610148. PMID 4595183.
- Enersen, Ole Daniel. "Samuel Jones Gee". Who Named It?. Archived from the original on 20 May 2002.
- Williams, Katharine (March 2003). "Royal College of Physicians: GEE, Samuel Jones (1839–1911)". AIM25. Archived from the original on 28 March 2007.
