= Cyclic vomiting syndrome =

Human disease

- Other names: Cyclical vomiting syndrome
- Specialty: Gastroenterology

Cyclic vomiting syndrome (CVS) is a chronic functional condition of unknown pathogenesis. CVS is characterized as recurring episodes lasting a single day to multiple weeks. Each episode is divided into four phases: inter-episodic, prodrome, vomiting, and recovery. During the inter-episodic phase, which typically lasts one week to one month, there are no discernible symptoms and normal activities can occur. The prodrome phase is known as the pre-emetic phase, characterized by the initial feeling of an approaching episode but still being able to keep down oral medication. The emetic or vomiting phase is characterized by intense persistent nausea and repeated vomiting, typically lasting hours to days. During the recovery phase, vomiting ceases, nausea diminishes or is absent, and appetite returns. "Cyclic vomiting syndrome (CVS) is a rare abnormality of the neuroendocrine system that affects 2% of children." This disorder is thought to be closely related to migraines and family history of migraines in some patients.

== Signs and symptoms ==
	Adults	Children
Mean age of diagnosis	29–34 years old	3–7 years old
Mean duration of episodes	3–6 days	few hours to 4 days
Mean Inter-episodic duration	1–3 months	1 week to 1 month
Presence of Prodrome phase	common	common
Recovery time	lasting several days	lasting hours to days
Vomiting	universal up to 6 times an hour	universal up to 6 times an hour
Abdominal pain	common (57–70%)	common (68–80%)
Upper Gastrointestinal Complications	common (38%)	common (22–32%)
Headaches	common	common
Fever	not common	not common
Dehydration needing IV fluids	common	common with longer attacks
Family history with migraines	common (30–70%)	common (40–89%)
Psychiatric disorders	common	common
Inter-episodic nausea/pain	common	rare
Mitochondrial DNA disorders	not reported	reported
Cannabis use	reported	not reported
Unpleasant triggers	common (67%)	common, harder to pinpoint

Affected people may vomit or retch 6–12 times per hour, and an episode may last from a few hours to over three weeks and in some cases months, with a median episode duration of 41 hours. Stomach acid, bile and, if the vomiting is severe, blood may be vomited. Some with the condition drink water to reduce the irritation of bile and acid on the esophagus during emesis. Between episodes, the affected person is usually healthy but can be in a state of fatigue or experience muscle pain. In approximately half of cases, the attacks, or episodes, occur in a time-related manner. Each attack is stereotypical; that is, in any given person, the timing, frequency, and severity of attacks is similar. Some affected people experience episodes that progressively worsen when left untreated, occurring more frequently with reduced symptom-free phases.

Episodes may happen every few days, every few weeks or every few months, for some happening at common uniform times, typically mornings. For other affected people, there is not a pattern in time that can be recognized. Some with the condition have a warning of an episodic attack; they may experience a prodrome, some documented prodromal symptoms include: unusually intense nausea and pallor, excess salivation, sweating, flushing, rapid/irregular heartbeat, diarrhea, anxiety/panic, food aversion, restlessness/insomnia, irritability, depersonalization, fatigue/listlessness, intense feelings of being hot or chilled, intense thirst, shivering/shaking, retching, tachypnea, abdominal pain/cramping, limb paresthesias, hyperesthesia, photophobia, phonophobia, headache, and dyspnea, heightened sensitivity, especially to light, though sensitivity to smell, sound, pressure, and temperature, as well as oncoming muscle pain and fatigue, are also reported by some patients. Many experience a full panic attack when nausea begins and continue to panic once the vomiting has begun. Medications like lorazepam, alprazolam, and other benzodiazepines are prescribed by their doctors and instructed to take immediately at the onset of any of their CVS symptoms and/or triggers. Some prodromal symptoms are present inter-episodically as well as during acute phases of illness. The majority of affected people can identify triggers that may precede an attack. The most common are various foods, infections (such as colds), menstruation, extreme physical exertion, lack of sleep, and psychological stresses, both positive and negative.

An affected person may also be light-sensitive (photophobic), sound-sensitive (phonophobic) or, less frequently, temperature- or pressure-sensitive during an attack. Some people also have a strong urge to bathe in warm or cold water. In fact, many people with CVS experience a compulsion to be submerged in hot water, and end up taking several baths during the duration of an episode. For some the psychological compulsion to be in hot water is so extreme that they cannot stop themselves from taking very long baths in near scalding hot water several times per day. For some of these people, they may have just finished taking a lengthy bath in extremely hot water and immediately feel this compulsion again and end up taking another bath right after drying off. Some people with the condition experience insomnia, diarrhea (GI complications), hot and cold flashes, and excessive sweating before an episode. Some report that they experience a restless sensation or stinging pain along the spine, hands, and feet followed by weakness in both legs. Some of these symptoms may be due to dehydration or hypokalemia from excessive vomiting, rather than the underlying cause of CVS.

== Genetics ==
There is no known genetic pathogenesis for CVS. Recent studies suggest many affected individuals have a family history of related conditions, such as migraines, psychiatric disorders and gastrointestinal disorders. Inheritance is thought to be maternal, a possible genetic mitochondrial inheritance. Adolescents show higher possible mitochondrial inheritance and maternal inheritance than found in adults. Single base-pair and DNA rearrangements in the mitochondrial DNA (mtDNA) have been associated with these traits.

== Diagnosis ==
The cause of CVS has not been determined and there are no specific diagnostic tests for CVS. Several other medical conditions, such as cannabinoid hyperemesis syndrome (CHS) or ureteropelvic junction (UPJ) obstruction, can present the same symptoms, and the differential diagnosis for CVS is very wide. An estimated 12% of people fitting the criteria for CVS have specific and possibly serious gastrointestinal, renal, neurological, or metabolic disease. If all other possible causes have been ruled out, a diagnosis of CVS using Rome criteria by a physician may be appropriate.

Once formal investigations to rule out gastrointestinal or other causes have been conducted, these tests do not need to be repeated in the event of future episodes.

=== Diagnostic criteria ===
Due to the lack of specific biomarkers available for the disorder, and if all other possible causes can be ruled out (such as intestinal malrotation), physicians rely on the Rome IV process criteria in order to diagnose patients. Patients must meet all these criteria to receive diagnosis:

1. Stereotypical episodes of acute vomiting each with a duration of less than one week.
2. A history of at least three discrete episodes in the prior year and at least two episodes in the past six months, each occurring at least one week apart.
3. An absence of vomiting between episodes, but other milder symptoms can be present between cycles.

Criteria must be fulfilled for the last 3 months with symptom onset at least 6 months prior to diagnosis. A history of family history of migraine headaches can also be used in facilitating diagnosis.

== Treatment ==
Treatment for cyclic vomiting syndrome depends on the evident phase of the disorder and the symptoms reported.

Episodes that are associated with migraines may respond to treatments effective for abdominal migraines. Prophylactic migraine medications, such as topiramate and amitriptyline, have seen recent success in treatment for the prodrome and vomiting phases, reducing the duration, severity, and frequency of episodes. Patients with non-migraine-associated CVS may be less responsive to migraine medications and have been proposed to have a distinct subtype of CVS.

Therapeutic treatment for the prodromal phase, characterized by the anticipation of an episode, consists of sumatriptan (nasal or oral) an anti-migraine medication, anti-inflammatory drugs to reduce abdominal pain, and possible anti-emetic drugs. These options may be helpful in preventing an episode or reducing the severity of an attack.

The most common therapeutic strategies for those already in the vomiting phase are maintenance of salt balance by appropriate intravenous fluids. Sedation via high dose intravenous benzodiazepines, typically lorazepam, has been shown to shorten the length of emergency department stays for some patients. Having vomited for a long period prior to attending a hospital, patients are typically severely dehydrated. For a number of patients, potent anti-emetic drugs such as ondansetron (Zofran) or granisetron (Kytril), and dronabinol (Marinol) may be helpful in either preventing an attack, aborting an attack, or reducing the severity of an attack. Many patients seek comfort during episodes by taking prolonged showers and baths typically quite hot. The use of a heating pad may also help reduce abdominal pain.

Lifestyle changes may be recommended, such as extended rest, reduction of stress, frequent small meals, and to abstain from fasting. A diet change may be recommended avoid food allergens, eliminating trigger foods such as chocolates, cheese, beer, and red wine.

Some patients experience relief from inhaled isopropyl alcohol.

Intravenous haloperidol may be an effective treatment.

== Prognosis ==
Fitzpatrick et al. (2007) identified 41 children with CVS. The mean age of the sample was 6 years at the onset of the syndrome, 8 years at first diagnosis, and 13 years at follow-up. As many as 39% of the children had resolution of symptoms immediately or within weeks of the diagnosis. Vomiting had resolved at the time of follow-up in 61% of the sample. Many children, including those in the remitted group, continued to have somatic symptoms such as headaches (in 42%) and abdominal pain (in 37%).

Most children who have this disorder miss on average 24 school days a year. The frequency of episodes is higher for some people during times of excitement. Charitable organizations to support affected people and their families and to promote knowledge of CVS exist in several countries.

A 2005 study by Fleisher et al. identified 41 adults who had been previously seen for complaints compatible with CVS. The average age at presentation of the sample was 34 years, and the mean age at onset was 21 years. The mean duration of the CVS at the time of consultation was 12 years. Of the 39 patients surveyed, 85% had episodes that were fairly uniform in length. Most patients reported these attacks in the morning hours. Of those 39 patients, 32% were completely disabled and required financial support due to CVS. Despite this, data suggests that the prognosis for CVS is generally favorable.

Complications can include dehydration, dental caries, or an esophageal tear.

== Epidemiology ==
The average age at onset is 3–7 years, with described cases as young as 6 days and as old as 73 years. Typical delay in diagnosis from onset of symptoms is 3 years. Females show a slight predominance over males.

One study found that 3 in 100,000 five-year-olds are diagnosed with the condition. Two studies on childhood CVS suggest nearly 2% of school-age children may have CVS.

== History ==
Cyclic vomiting syndrome was first described in France by Swiss physician Henri Clermond Lombard and first described in the English language by pediatrician Samuel Gee in 1882.

It has been suggested that Charles Darwin's adult illnesses may have been due to this syndrome. Darwin's illness had features seen in patients with cyclic vomiting, in particular his susceptibility to seasickness when onboard HMS Beagle, episodes being brought on by pleasurable events, and his periods of extreme lethargy dating back to his university student days. However in Darwin's case it is argued that his vomiting was due to an inherited mitochondrial disorder.

== See also ==
- Migraine
- Cannabinoid hyperemesis syndrome
