= Parcopresis =

Inability to defecate without a certain level of privacy

- Other names: Psychogenic fecal retention
- Specialty: Psychology

Parcopresis, also termed psychogenic fecal retention or shy bowel, and known colloquially as poop shy, is the inability to defecate without a certain level of privacy. It can be either a difficulty or inability to defecate due to significant psychological distress, and is associated with avoidance in public and social situations. It is typically researched alongside and has comorbidity with paruresis, which is an inability or difficulty to urinate in the presence of others.

Parcopresis is not a medically recognized condition, although one case report in 2011 suggests it should be classified as a form of social phobia. As of 2019, little is known about parcopresis and it has unknown prevalence. One 2021 study with a sample size of 714 university students found that a gender-adjusted 14.4% of the study population avoided using public toilets for fears associated with parcopresis, with significantly higher prevalence among females. Cognitive behavioral therapy is speculated to provide the most benefit, but there is not yet research to support this claim.

== See also ==
- Encopresis, where fecal incontinence occurs in children
