= Levomepromazine =

Typical antipsychotic medication

- Molecular structure of levomepromazine

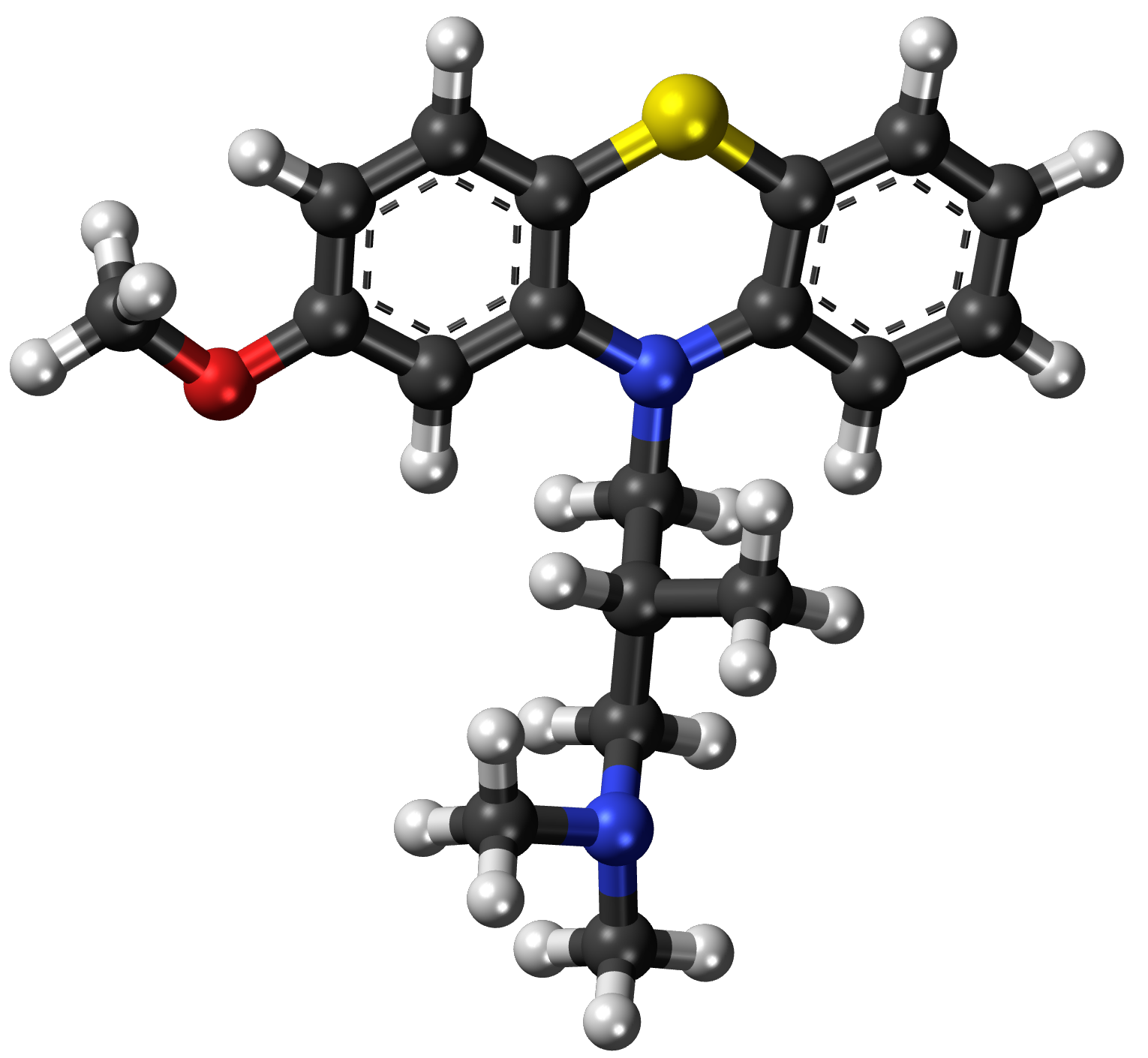
- 3D representation of a levomepromazine molecule

Clinical data
- AHFS/Drugs.com: Micromedex Detailed Consumer Information
- Pregnancy category: Only if clearly needed
- Routes of administration: Oral, seldom IM
- Drug class: Typical antipsychotic
- ATC code: N05AA02 (WHO)

Legal status
- Legal status: AU: S4 (Prescription only); BR: Class C1 (Other controlled substances); UK: POM (Prescription only)

Pharmacokinetic data
- Bioavailability: ~50–60%
- Metabolism: Hepatic
- Elimination half-life: ~20 hours
- Excretion: In feces and urine (metabolites), unchanged drug only 1%

Identifiers
- IUPAC name: (2R)-3-(2-Methoxyphenothiazine-10-yl-)-N,N,2-trimethylpropanamine
- CAS Number: 60-99-1 7104-38-3 (maleate), 1236-99-3 HCl)
- PubChem CID: 72287
- IUPHAR/BPS: 7603
- DrugBank: DB01403
- ChemSpider: 65239
- UNII: 9G0LAW7ATQ
- KEGG: D00403
- ChEBI: CHEBI:6838
- ChEMBL: ChEMBL1764
- CompTox Dashboard (EPA): DTXSID1023289
- ECHA InfoCard: 100.000.450

Chemical and physical data
- Formula: C_{19}H_{24}N_{2}OS
- Molar mass: 328.47 g·mol^{−1}
- 3D model (JSmol): Interactive image
- SMILES: O(c2cc1N(c3c(Sc1cc2)cccc3)C[C@H](C)CN(C)C)C
- InChI: InChI=1S/C19H24N2OS/c1-14(12-20(2)3)13-21-16-7-5-6-8-18(16)23-19-10-9-15(22-4)11-17(19)21/h5-11,14H,12-13H2,1-4H3/t14-/m1/s1; Key:VRQVVMDWGGWHTJ-CQSZACIVSA-N

Levomepromazine, also known as methotrimeprazine, is a phenothiazine neuroleptic drug. Brand names include Nozinan, Levoprome, Detenler, Hirnamin, Levotomin and Neurocil. It is a low-potency antipsychotic (approximately half as potent as chlorpromazine) with strong analgesic, hypnotic and antiemetic properties that are primarily used in palliative care.

Serious side effects include tardive dyskinesia, akathisia, abnormalities in the electrical cycle of the heart, low blood pressure and the potentially fatal neuroleptic malignant syndrome.

As is typical of phenothiazine antipsychotics, levomepromazine is a "dirty drug", that is, it exerts its effects by blocking a variety of receptors, including adrenergic receptors, dopamine receptors, histamine receptors, muscarinic acetylcholine receptors and serotonin receptors.

== Medical uses ==
It can be used as an analgesic for moderate to severe pain in non-ambulant patients (the latter being because of its strong sedative effects).

Levomepromazine is also used at lower doses for the treatment of nausea and insomnia.

The usual dose for nausea is 10-20 mg taken when symptoms occur. It can also be used to treat cannabinoid hyperemesis syndrome.

The maximum dose for any disorder being treated is usually between 200 mg and 300 mg per day but some patients may only need 20-50 mg per day even when treating mania.

Levomepromazine is frequently prescribed and valued worldwide in palliative care medicine for its multimodal action, to treat intractable nausea or vomiting, and for severe delirium/agitation in the last days of life. Palliative care physicians will commonly prescribe it orally or via subcutaneous syringe drivers in combination with opioid analgesics such as hydromorphone.

Levomepromazine is used for the treatment of psychosis, particularly those of schizophrenia, and manic phases of bipolar disorder. It should only be used with caution in the treatment of agitated depressions, as it can cause akathisia as a side effect, which could worsen the agitation. A 2010 systematic review compared the efficacy of levomepromazine with atypical antipsychotic drugs:

Levomepromazine versus atypical antipsychotic drugs for schizophrenia
Summary

Data are few and not high quality making it impossible to be confident about the effects for schizophrenia.

Outcome	Findings in words	Findings in numbers	Quality of evidence
Global state
Not much improved (CGI); Follow-up: short-term	Levomepromazine may increase the risk of not seeing an improvement when compared with atypical antipsychotic drugs, but, at present there are only very limited data supporting this finding.	RR 2.33 (1.11 to 4.89)	Very low
Mental state
Any response (<20% decrease PANSS; Follow-up: short-term	At present it is not possible to be confident about the difference between people given levomepromazine and those receiving atypical antipsychotic drugs. There is very limited data to support this finding.	RR 2.5 (0.93 to 6.72)	Very low
Adverse events
Constipation	Levomepromazine may slightly reduce the risk of constipation but there is no clear difference between people given levomepromazine and those receiving atypical antipsychotics. These findings are based on data of low quality.	RR 0.45 (0.07 to 2.94)	Low
Dizziness	Levomepromazine may increase the chance of experiencing dizziness when compared with atypical antipsychotic drugs. Data are based on low quality evidence.	RR 2.59 (1.23 to 5.46)	Low
Drowsiness	There is no clear difference for the outcome of 'drowsiness' between people given levomepromazine and those receiving atypical antipsychotic drugs. These findings are based on data of low quality.	RR 0.62 (0.29 to 1.32)	Low
Dry mouth	Dry mouth is no more or less common with levomepromazine compared with those receiving atypical antipsychotic drugs. These findings are based on data of low quality.	RR 0.93 (0.45 to 1.95)	Low
Extrapyramidal symptoms - Needing antiparkinsonian medication	Levomepromazine may reduce the risk of movement disorders but, with current data, there is no clear difference between people given levomepromazine and those receiving atypical antipsychotic drugs. These findings are based on data of very limited quality.	RR 0.6 (0.16 to 2.2)	Very low

== Adverse effects ==
The most common side effect is akathisia. Levomepromazine has prominent sedative and anticholinergic/sympatholytic effects (dry mouth, hypotension, sinus tachycardia, night sweats) and may cause weight gain. These side effects normally preclude prescribing the drug in doses needed for full remission of schizophrenia, so it has to be combined with a more potent antipsychotic. In any case, blood pressure and EKG should be monitored regularly.

A rare but life-threatening side effect is neuroleptic malignant syndrome (NMS). The symptoms of NMS include muscle stiffness, convulsions and fever.

== History ==
The drug (under the name Nozinan) started clinical trials in France in 1956 and was studied in Canada 3 years later.
