= Scandinavian Journal of Gastroenterology =

- Discipline: Gastroenterology
- Language: English
- Edited by: Helge Waldum

Publication details
- History: 1966-present
- Publisher: Informa
- Frequency: Monthly
- Impact factor: 2.329 (2013)

Standard abbreviations
- ISO 4: Scand. J. Gastroenterol.

Indexing
- CODEN: SJGRA4
- ISSN: 0036-5521 (print); 1502-7708 (web)
- OCLC no.: 37664094

Links
- Journal homepage; Online access; online archive

The Scandinavian Journal of Gastroenterology is a monthly peer-reviewed medical journal covering the field of gastroenterology. It is published by Informa and was established in 1966. The editor in chief is Helge Waldum. According to the Journal Citation Reports, the journal has a 2013 impact factor of 2.329.
