= Cannabinoid hyperemesis syndrome =

Nausea and vomiting resulting from cannabis use

- Specialty: Gastroenterology
- Symptoms: Nausea, vomiting, stomach pain
- Complications: Kidney failure
- Causes: Use of cannabis
- Diagnostic method: Based on the symptoms
- Differential diagnosis: Cyclical vomiting syndrome
- Treatment: Cannabis cessation, hot baths and showers
- Medication: Capsaicin cream, haloperidol, levomepromazine, olanzapine, lorazepam, diphenhydramine

Cannabinoid hyperemesis syndrome (CHS) is recurrent nausea, vomiting, and cramping abdominal pain that can occur due to chronic cannabis use.

CHS is associated with frequent (weekly or more often), long-term (several months or longer) cannabis use; synthetic cannabinoids can also cause CHS. The underlying mechanism is unclear, with several possibilities proposed. Diagnosis is based on the symptoms; a history of cannabis use, especially persistent, frequent use of high-dose cannabis products; and ruling out other possible causes of hyperemesis (persistent vomiting). The condition is typically present for some time before the diagnosis is made.

The only known curative treatment for CHS is to stop using cannabis. Symptoms usually remit after two weeks of complete abstinence, although some patients continue to experience nausea, cyclic vomiting, or abdominal pain for up to 90 days. Treatments during an episode of vomiting are generally supportive in nature (one example being hydration). There is tentative evidence for the use of capsaicin cream on the abdomen during an acute episode.

Frequent hot showers or baths are both a possible sign (diagnostic indicator) of CHS, and a short-term palliative treatment (often called hot water hydrotherapy in the medical literature).

Another condition that presents similarly is cyclic vomiting syndrome (CVS). The primary differentiation between CHS and CVS is that cessation of cannabis use resolves CHS, but not CVS. Another key difference is that CVS symptoms typically begin during the early morning; predominant morning symptoms are not characteristic of CHS. Distinguishing the two can be difficult since many people with CVS use cannabis, possibly to relieve their symptoms.

The syndrome was first described in 2004, and simplified diagnostic criteria were published in 2009.

== Signs and symptoms ==
Given the well known antiemetic properties of cannabinoids, CHS symptoms are paradoxical. The most prominent CHS symptoms are cyclical nausea, vomiting, and abdominal pain, concomitant with chronic cannabinoid use. There are three phases of CHS: the prodromal phase, the hyperemetic phase, and the recovery phase.

=== Prodromal phase ===
The prodromal phase is characterized by mild symptoms of CHS, including nausea, anxiety and fear related to vomiting, mild abdominal discomfort, sweating, and increased thirst; symptoms can be more severe in the morning, but this is not always the case. During this phase, treatment with compulsive bathing is rarely reported, and some individuals may attempt to treat their symptoms with cannabis use. This phase can last for months to years.

=== Hyperemetic phase ===
The hyperemetic phase is characterized by the full syndromal symptoms of CHS, including persistent nausea, vomiting, abdominal pain, and retching. Retching can occur up to five times per hour. Acute episodes of cannabinoid hyperemesis typically last for 24–48 hours. The symptoms experienced in this phase are cyclical, and can recur unpredictably in intervals of weeks to months. It is very difficult to take food or medicine by mouth during this stage, and patients may develop a fear of eating. Weight loss and dehydration due to decreased oral intake and vomiting are possible. It is during this hyperemetic phase that people with CHS are likely to present to the emergency department of the hospital for treatment.

Many patients learn through experience that long hot showers or baths relieve symptoms, which can lead to compulsive hot water bathing. Thus, lengthy hot showers or baths are a diagnostic indicator for CHS. People have described the hot water relief as "temperature-dependent," meaning that hotter temperatures provide greater relief.

=== Recovery phase ===
The recovery phase begins after the patient abstains from cannabis consumption, but the time for resolution of symptoms is unclear: it has been reported to occur within two weeks in some cases, but in others it may take one to three months. Patients often regain lost weight with adequate hydration and caloric intake. Long hot showers or baths (hot water hydrotherapy) continue to provide symptomatic relief (similar to the hyperemesis phase), but as CHS symptom severity lessens with sustained abstinence, the need for hot water bathing recedes. If a person in this phase consumes cannabis again, their symptoms usually return. Relapses are common due to resuming cannabis consumption, developing tolerance, using cannabis more often and shifting to higher potency formulations to achieve the desired high, and, when nausea returns, consuming even more cannabis (since it initially has an anti-emetic effect). Education about this vicious cycle, along with evidence-based treatment for cannabis use disorder, such as motivational interviewing and relapse prevention, often prove beneficial.

=== Complications ===
Complications include persistent vomiting and dehydration, which may lead to kidney failure and electrolyte imbalances. In the scientific literature, a 2016 case report documented the first known deaths associated with cannabinoid hyperemesis syndrome (CHS), in which two men died from hyponatremic dehydration.

== Pathogenesis ==
Cannabis contains more than 400 different chemicals, of which about 60 are cannabinoids. The chemical composition of cannabis may vary between cannabis products, making it difficult to identify the specific chemical(s) responsible for the syndrome. The pathophysiology of CHS is complicated by the complex action of these chemicals throughout the body, both in the central nervous system and in the gastrointestinal system. Cannabis-related factors, such as the amount of THC in the cannabis, the amount of use, and the duration of use likely play a role, but are not yet well understood. Other factors, such as chronic stress, genetics, and emotional factors, may influence the risk for CHS.

Various pathogenic mechanistic theories attempting to explain symptoms have been put forward:

- dose-dependent buildup of cannabinoids and related effects of cannabinoid toxicity
- the functionality of cannabinoid receptors in the brain and particularly in the hypothalamus (which regulates body temperature and the digestive system)
- direct stimulation of cannabinoid receptors in the digestive system.

It has been hypothesized that certain people may be genetically pre-disposed to metabolize cannabinoids in an atypical manner, making them susceptible to CHS.

Another cannabinoid called cannabigerol acts as an antagonist at cannabinoid (CB1) and serotonin (5HT1A) receptors, antagonizing the anti-emetic effects of cannabidiol that occurs through its effects on serotonin.

=== Cannabinoid buildup theory ===
Tetrahydrocannabinol (THC) is a fat-soluble cannabinoid that can be deposited into a person's fat stores, accounting for the long elimination half-life of THC. During periods of stress or food deprivation, a person's fat stores can be mobilized (lipolysis) for energy consumption, releasing the previously stored THC back into the blood. The mechanism can be characterized as a "reintoxication effect."

== Diagnosis ==
The diagnostic criteria for CHS were ill-defined prior to the establishment of the Rome IV criteria of 2016. Per the Rome IV criteria, all 3 of the following must be met to be diagnosed with CHS. They must be present for at least the last three months and the beginning of symptoms must be at least 6 months prior to the diagnosis being made.

1. Episodic vomiting that appears similar to cyclic vomiting syndrome
2. Symptom onset occurs after prolonged cannabis use
3. Resolution of symptoms with sustained abstinence from cannabis use

A complete history of the person's use of cannabinoids is important in establishing the correct diagnosis. CHS has often been undiagnosed, sometimes for years. This may be due to reluctance on behalf of patients to fully disclose their use of cannabis to healthcare professionals, especially when another person is accompanying the patient to an appointment or emergency department visit. Identifying the correct diagnosis saves money for the healthcare system and reduces morbidity associated with the condition.

A urine drug screen can be useful for objectively determining the presence of cannabinoids in a person's system. Cannabinoid metabolites (specifically 11-nor-Δ9-carboxylic acid) can be detected in urine for about 2 to 8 days with short-term use, and for 14–42 days of chronic use.

Other commonly used diagnostic tests include laboratory blood tests (complete blood count, blood glucose, basic metabolic panel, pancreatic and liver enzymes), pregnancy test, urinalysis, and imaging (X-ray and CT scan). These are used to rule out other causes of abdominal pain, such as pregnancy, pancreatitis, hepatitis or infection.

Differential Diagnoses

Prior to diagnosing and treating for presumed CHS, more serious medical conditions need to be ruled out. The differential diagnoses include, but are not limited to, cyclic vomiting syndrome, bowel perforation or obstruction, gastroparesis, cholangitis, pancreatitis, nephrolithiasis, cholecystitis, diverticulitis, ectopic pregnancy, pelvic inflammatory disease, heart attack, acute hepatitis, adrenal insufficiency, and ruptured aortic aneurysm. However, if simple laboratory tests and imaging have excluded more serious conditions, it is reasonable to monitor for a worsening of the patient's status to prevent the unnecessary application of more invasive, and potentially dangerous, diagnostic procedures (such as exploratory surgery). In general, CHS is most often misdiagnosed as cyclic vomiting syndrome.

== Treatment ==
Many traditional medications for nausea and vomiting are ineffective. Treatment is supportive and focuses on stopping cannabis use. Proper patient education includes informing patients that their symptoms are caused by their use of cannabis/cannabinoids, and that exposure to cannabinoids in the future are likely to cause their symptoms to return. Clinical pharmacists can play a role in administering this education, as well as encouraging patients to seek the assistance of mental health providers. Abstinence from cannabinoids currently remains the only definitive treatment. Cognitive behavioral therapy and motivational enhancement therapy are evidence-based outpatient treatment options for patients with cannabis use disorder.

Symptomatic relief is noted with exposure to hot water (greater than 41°C, 106°F), which is mediated by TRPV – the capsaicin receptor. Assessing for dehydration (due to vomiting and hot showers) is important as it can lead to acute kidney failure, and this is easily treated with IV fluids. If dehydration is severe, hospitalization may be required. Based on the mechanism of the effect, some clinicians have used topical capsaicin cream applied to the periumbilical area in the treatment of acute CHS. Capsaicin cream can be applied topically to the abdomen when a patient experiences nausea and vomiting. This treatment works by targeting the TRPV1 receptor, which helps suppress vomiting by modulating a complex network of signaling pathways. The use of capsaicin as first-line treatment for CHS has been well tolerated, though the evidence for its effectiveness is limited. The use of hot water showers in the emergency department setting has been advocated in situations where topical capsaicin cream is unavailable, though the same precautions to hot water use (dehydration, burn injury) are required. While the relationship between CHS and relief with hot water is widely documented, it is not the experience of all individuals with this condition.

The use of antipsychotics, such as haloperidol and olanzapine, have provided partial relief of symptoms in case-reports. The evidence for the use of benzodiazepines, such as lorazepam, has shown mixed results. Other drug treatments that have been tried, with unclear efficacy, include neurokinin-1 receptor antagonists, first-generation antihistamines (e.g. diphenhydramine), 5-HT_{3} receptor antagonists (e.g. ondansetron), and non-antipsychotic antidopaminergics (e.g. metoclopramide). Levomepromazine may be effective for CHS but it is not available in the United States.

Acetaminophen has shown some benefit in case reports for alleviating headaches associated with CHS. Opioids can provide some relief of abdominal pain, but their use is discouraged due to the risk of worsening nausea and vomiting.

== Epidemiology ==
The exact proportion of the population affected by this syndrome is difficult to conclude because there have not always been specific criteria for diagnosis, there are no diagnostic tests to confirm it, and cannabis use may not be reported truthfully. A 2018 study that surveyed patients from an urban emergency department found that 32.9% of people who reported cannabis use of at least 20 days per month met criteria for CHS. Using this data, the authors estimated that roughly 2.75 million Americans suffer from CHS. However, the author and other experts on the subject acknowledge that there are limitations to this estimation and the prevalence of this disease can not be concluded at this time. A particular flaw of the study is that heavy marijuana users were counted as having CHS based only on whether they considered hot showers effective for relieving nausea, independently of whether they frequently had nausea or other CHS symptoms.

At least eight deaths related to CHS have been reported in the United States. Since its documentation in 2004, there has been a significant rise in reported cases. Accurate tracking of the condition is difficult due to inconsistent recording in medical records. The rise of the syndrome in the past two decades coincides with the expansion of marijuana legalization in the United States. An analysis of data from the National Emergency Department Sample between 2006 and 2013 found an increase in emergency room attendees with vomiting who also had cannabis use disorder, to a rate of approximately 13 per 100,000 attendees. It is possible this rise, of around 5 1/2 times, may be affected by sampling bias, as initial awareness of CHS prompted more diligent questioning and recording of when such ER attendees were also cannabis users.

The number of people affected was unclear as of 2015. CHS has been reported more frequently in people that use cannabis daily (47.9% of people with CHS) and greater than daily (23.7% of people with CHS), compared to once weekly users (19.4% of people with CHS) and less frequent users (2.4% of people with CHS). A significant increase in the incidence of CHS (and other cannabis-related visits to the emergency department) has been noted in U.S. states that have legalized cannabis, with the incidence of cyclic vomiting prominently doubling in the US state of Colorado after legalization. As the use of cannabis continues to be legalized at the state level, the prevalence of CHS is expected to increase in the US.

As of 2017 a French pharmacovigilance program for drug users had received reports of 29 cases of CHS. At the time there were 113 case described in the international medical literature. CHS incidence is likely to have been substantially under-reported. A retrospective application of the 2016 Rome IV criteria to cases recorded in prior literature suggested that the number of people with CHS had been over-estimated.

== History ==
Cannabinoid hyperemesis was first reported in the Adelaide Hills of South Australia in 2004 by an analysis of only 9 patients (originally 19; 10 dropped out of the study) referred to participate in this study with the goal to link cannabis to a vomiting syndrome due to the patients' previously diagnosed cyclical vomiting syndrome and that they happened to use cannabis. CHS was not reported in users of synthetic cannabinoids until 2013 despite widespread use occurring as early as 2009 and having a significantly higher cannabinoid receptor action than THC.

The name "cannabinoid hyperemesis syndrome" was also coined at this time. The report focused on nine patients who were chronic cannabis users who presented with cyclical vomiting illness. One woman in the study reported that warm baths provided the only relief from the nausea, severe vomiting, and stomach pain, and reportedly burned herself in a hot water bath three times trying to get relief.

== Society and culture ==
CHS is not well known. An emergency department physician in 2018 commented that the condition was not on their "radar" in the five years prior, though the condition was being diagnosed more often now. Many people are surprised by the notion that cannabis can induce symptoms of nausea and vomiting, given the fact that cannabis is used to prevent nausea and vomiting.

The portmanteau "scromiting" (scream + vomiting) has been used as a colloquial name for the condition, though it is not clear how widespread the use of the term is.

Actor David Krumholtz told The New York Times in 2024 that he had lost over 100 pounds and needed to be hospitalized several times due to cannabinoid hyperemesis syndrome. Krumholtz admitted that he had spend up to 10 hours at a time in hot baths to relieve symptoms. After CHS nearly cost him his role in the 2023 film Oppenheimer, he quit using cannabis permanently.
