= Visceral pain =

Type of pain in the organs

Visceral pain is defined as pain that results from the activation of nociceptors of the thoracic, pelvic, or abdominal viscera (internal organs) in the human body. Visceral structures are highly sensitive to distension (stretch), ischemia and inflammation, but relatively insensitive to other stimuli that normally evoke pain such as cutting or burning.

Visceral pain is diffuse, difficult to localize, and often referred to a distant, usually superficial, structure. It may be accompanied by symptoms such as nausea, vomiting, changes in vital signs as well as emotional manifestations. The pain may be described as sickening, throbbing, pulsating, deep, squeezing, and/or dull.

== Physiology ==
=== Nociceptive innervation ===
Nociceptive innervation is often the only type of sensory innervation possessed by visceral structures. Nociceptive innervation of visceral structures entails two distinct modalities:

- The actual viscera possess sparse nociceptive innervation via "slow" group C nerve fibers which are bundled into autonomic nerves to be conveyed to the spinal cord segments where the organ which they innervate originally arose during embryological development; in the spinal cord, the central branch of the visceral nociceptive neuron then synapses with multiple 2nd-order nociceptive neurons which also receive nociceptive stimuli from 1st-order nociceptive neurons innervating the skin. Consequently, true visceral pain is perceived as dull chronic pain referred to the dermatomes of the body surface innervated by nociceptive neurons from the same spinal cord segments as the embryologic origin of the affected organ. Due to the sparse innervation, highly localised insults (like incision through the visceral surface of a viscera) tends to be relatively or completely painless, whereas insults that cause diffuse activation of visceral nociceptive produce intense suffering.
- Parietal surfaces (like the parietal surface of the peritoneum, pericardium, and pleura) possess abundant nociceptive innervation (much like the skin) directly from local spinal nerves. Parietal pain is thus typically experienced as having a sharp quality and perceived directly over the affected visceral area, and may be evoked by a local insult like an incision.

When both visceral and parietal nociceptors are activated, both pain modalities will be perceived simultaneously (for example, appendicitis may be associated with dull visceral pain at the level of the umbilicus (T10-T11) as well as sharp parietal pain at the lower right quadrant of the abomen).

The liver parenchyma and lung alveoli are virtually free of nociceptive innervation; nevertheless, bile ducts and the connective tissue covering of the liver are sensitive to pain, as are the bronchi and parietal pleura.

=== Mechanisms ===
Visceral pain may be evoked by:

- tissue ischaemia,
- chemical insults to visceral surfaces (e.g. gastric juice containing gastric acid and proteolytic enzymes, or pancreatic juice spilling into the peritoneum),
- spasm of smooth muscle in the walls of hollow viscera (e.g. as seen in appendicitis, gastroenteritis, constipation, gallbladder disease, urethral obstruction, menstruation, or childbirth) - pain may be mediated either by direct mechanical stimulation of nociceptors, or by decreased perfusion and increased metabolic rate of actively contracting muscle; pain caused by spasmatic contraction of smooth muscle of hollow viscera is often experienced as cramp-like and as waxing and waning - as each peristaltic wave causes a spasm of a hyperecticable region of smooth muscle upon reaching it,
- excessive distension of a hollow viscera - possibly by overstretching of nociceptive fibres, or compression of blood vessels to cause ischaemia,
- extension of the connective tissues upon or within visceral organs.

==== Visceral hyperalgesia ====
Inflammation, or repetitive or prolongued exposure to non-noxious stimuli may render viscera hyperalgesic, lowering the pain threshold of affected viscera. For example, repetitive experimental filling of the distal colon of human subjects initially produces distension that is perceived as painless, but the same distension subsequently comes to be experienced as painful. Such hyperalgesia may underlie pain experienced in certain clinical conditions like inflammatory bowel disease and may thus also represent a therapeutic target.

== Clinical presentation ==
Visceral pain is one of the main presenting complaints of patients and is frequently encountered in the clinical setting. True visceral pain.

Visceral pain is typically associated with autonomic symptoms (e.g. pallor, sweating, nausea, vomit, changes in vital signs including blood pressure, heart rate and/or temperature). Strong emotional reactions are also common presenting signs and may include anxiety, anguish and a sense of impending doom.

Importantly, perceived intensity of pain may often be unrelated to the actual clinical severity of the underlying pathology causing the pain (e.g. silent heart attack). More rarely, intense visceral pain may be associated with a more innocuous aetiology (e.g. severe flatulence).

The dermatomes experiencing referred pain may become affected by secondary hyperalgesia - especially when the causative visceral pain has been recurrent or chronic. Secondary hyperalgesia may persist after the underlying condition has been resolved.

=== Progression ===
Milder incohate true visceral pain can be perceived as vague malaise and discomfort (rather than "hurt"), accompanied by autonomic signs and emotional distress, and localised indistinctly to the midline lower sternal region or epigastrium regardless of the underlying aetiology (rather than being referred as occurs with progression to more severe pain). With the onset of referred pain, the autonomic and emotional symptoms abate.

== Treatment ==
There are two goals when treating visceral pain:

- to alleviate the current experience of pain and
- to address any underlying pathology, if and when identifiable.

Treatment of the pain in many circumstances should be deferred, until the origin of the symptoms has been identified. Masking pain may confound the diagnostic process and delay the recognition of life-threatening conditions. Once a treatable condition has been identified there is no reason to withhold symptomatic treatment. Also, if cause for the pain is not found in reasonable time then symptomatic treatment of the pain could be of benefit to the patient in order to prevent long-term sensitization and provide immediate relief.

Symptomatic treatment of visceral pain relies primarily upon pharmacotherapy. Since visceral pain can result secondary to a wide variety of causes, with or without associated pathology, a wide variety of pharmacological classes of drugs are used including a variety of analgesics (ex. opiates, NSAIDs, cannabinoids), antispasmodics (ex. loperamide, benzodiazepines), antidepressants (ex. TCA, SSRI, SNRI) as well as others (ex. ketamine, clonidine, gabapentin). In addition, pharmacotherapy that targets the underlying cause of the pain can help alleviate symptoms due to lessening visceral nociceptive inputs. For example, the use of nitrates can reduce anginal pain by dilating the coronary arteries and thus reducing the ischemia causing the pain. The use of spasmolytics (antispasmodics) can help alleviate pain from a gastrointestinal obstruction by inhibiting the contraction of the gut. There are issues associated with pharmacotherapy that include side effects (ex. constipation associated with opiate use), chemical dependence or addiction, and inadequate pain relief.

Invasive therapies are in general reserved for patients in whom pharmacological and other non-invasive therapies are ineffective. A wide variety of interventions are available and shown to be effective, a few will be discussed here. Approximately 50–80% of pelvic cancer pain patients benefit from nerve blocks. Nerve blocks offer temporary relief and typically involve injection of a nerve bundle with either a local anesthetic, a steroid, or both. Permanent nerve block can be produced by destruction of nerve tissue. Strong evidence from multiple randomized controlled trials support the use of neurolytic celiac plexus block to alleviate pain and reduce opioid consumption in patients with malignant pain originating from abdominal viscera such as the pancreas. Neurostimulation, from a device such as a spinal cord stimulator (SCS), for refractory angina has been shown to be effective in several randomized controlled trials. A SCS may also be used for other chronic pain conditions such as chronic pancreatitis and familial Mediterranean fever. Other devices that have shown benefit in reducing pain include transcutaneous electrical nerve stimulators (TENS), targeted field stimulation, both used for somatic hyperalgesic states, external neuromodulation, pulsed radiofrequency ablation and neuraxial drug delivery systems.

== Epidemiology ==
In the past, viscera were considered insensitive to pain but now it is clear that pain from internal organs is widespread and that its social burden may surpass that of pain from superficial (somatic) sources. Myocardial ischemia, the most frequent cause of cardiac pain, is the most common cause of death in the United States. Urinary colic produced from ureteral stones has been categorized as one of the most intense forms of pain that a human being can experience. The prevalence of such stones has continuously increased, reaching values of over 20% in developed countries. Surveys have shown prevalence rates among adults of 25% for intermittent abdominal pain and 20% for chest pain; 24% of women experience pelvic pain at any point in time. For over two-thirds of those affected, pain is accepted as part of daily life and symptoms are self-managed; a small proportion defer to specialists for help. Visceral pain conditions are associated with diminished quality of life, and exert a huge cost burden through medical expenses and lost productivity in the workplace.

== See also ==
- Referred pain
