= Khodorov =

Khodorov (Russian: Ходоров) may have multiple meanings:

- Khodoriv, a city in Ukraine that is sometimes known historically as Khodorov
- Boris Khodorov (1922–2014), Soviet and Russian physiologist

== See also ==
- Chodorov, a surname that can be a variant spelling of Khodorov
- Ya'akov Hodorov (1927–2006), Israeli footballer
- Matan Hodorov (born 1985), Israeli economic commentator
- Khodorkovsky
