= Anatoly Zubkov =

Russian physiologist

Anatoly Zubkov Анатолий Зубков
- Born: February 26, 1900; Moscow, Russian Empire
- Died: December 5, 1967 (aged 67); Chişinău, Moldavian SSR
- Citizenship: Russian Empire; USSR
- Education: Moscow State University (1923)
- Scientific career
- Fields: Physiology

Anatoly Zubkov (Russian: Анатолий Анатольевич Зубков; 1900–1967) was a Soviet physiologist, D.Sc. He held the chair of physiology in the Kishinev Medical Institute. Prof. Anatoly Zubkov had published over sixty works on the various problems of the physiology and pathology of the heart and the nervous and endocrine control of functions. He was the first to translate classic works by Ivan Sechenov into English.

== Publications ==
- Evgeni Babsky; Boris Khodorov; Grigory Kositsky; Anatoly Zubkov (1989). Evgeni Babsky (ed.). Human Physiology, in 2 vols. Translated by Ludmila Aksenova. Translation edited by H. C. Creighton (M.A., Oxon). Moscow: Mir Publishers. ISBN 5-03-000776-8First published in Russian as «Физиология человека»

== Bibliography ==
- "Прогулка по улице Рабфаковской (продолжение)" [The Zubkovs]. Директор-Иваново (in Russian). 107 (12). December 2009.
