= Endoluminal capsule monitoring =

Endoluminal capsule monitoring (also called a radio capsule or endoradiosonde; obsolete names include intestinal sensor and intestinal radiosonde) is a non-invasive medical diagnostic procedure that uses a miniaturized, ingestible capsule containing a wireless radio transmitter to measure physiological parameters, such as pH, temperature, and pressure, within the lumen of the gastrointestinal tract, transmitting the results by radio to an external receiving and recording device.

Radio capsules may be powered by an internal power source, powered externally, or may passively reflect a signal from an external source (echo-capsules). A capsule may either move freely through the gastrointestinal tract, or be attached to the mucosal lining of an organ or to a tether, from which it may later detach and continue moving freely.

== Components of the measurement system ==
The capsule itself is only one part of a larger measurement system. The signal it emits must be captured by a dedicated receiving device. Where precise localization of the capsule within the patient's gastrointestinal tract is not required, and the patient is expected to go about normal daily activities outside a clinical setting, the receiver is typically a small electronic unit carried in a pocket or worn on a belt, recording measurements as they are taken. After the procedure, the recorded data is transferred, for example, to a personal computer, for processing and analysis using dedicated software.

For studies of animal gastrointestinal tracts (for example, in cattle), the receiver may be placed at the boundary of an enclosure, with the capsule's transmitter and the receiver both requiring sufficient power and sensitivity, respectively, to maintain a usable signal.

Where the capsule's location must be determined, a single receiver is insufficient. Multiple receivers (three or more), spatially distributed, or specialized direction-finding belts, may be used to calculate the coordinates of the signal source; accurate localization generally requires the patient to remain still. Even precise coordinates, however, do not always indicate which specific anatomical segment of the gastrointestinal tract the capsule occupies at a given time.

In common usage, "developing a radio capsule" typically refers to developing the entire measurement system, the capsule, the receiver(s), and the analysis software, rather than the capsule alone.

== Measured parameters ==
According to the type(s) of biomedical sensor built into the capsule, several physiological parameters can be measured and transmitted:

- intraluminal pH in the esophagus, stomach, small intestine, and colon
- temperature
- intraluminal pressure
- transit time

A wireless motility capsule (WMC) can measure gastric emptying time to help diagnose gastroparesis or gastric dumping syndrome, and can also measure transit time through the small intestine and colon. The WMC uses pH changes to detect passage through the pyloric sphincter and the ileocecal valve, and uses a temperature sensor to detect elimination from the body.

Historically, the most commonly measured parameters have been intraluminal pressure, temperature, and acidity. Some capsule designs combine two or more parameters in a single device; others are produced as a series, with each capsule type carrying only one kind of sensor. Radio capsules have also been developed to measure the rate of nutrient breakdown in the gastrointestinal tract, oxygen content in the digestive organs, ionizing radiation intensity, and the presence of gastrointestinal bleeding, though these directions were not developed beyond individual prototypes or proposals.

=== Pressure-sensing capsules ===
Pressure-sensing radio capsules were the first type developed. Such a capsule typically comprises a pressure sensor, a high-frequency oscillator, and an independent power source. The pressure sensor must measure pressure from 0 to 200 cm of water column and respond to changes of ±5 mm of water column. The sensor may be of inductive or capacitive type.

An inductive sensor works by changing the inductance of a coil system as pressure acting on the sensor's membrane displaces a ferromagnetic or magneto-dielectric core or armature. A capacitive sensor instead relies on the change in gap between the plates of a flat capacitor as pressure changes.

Modern manometric methods commonly used to study the motor function of the digestive organs (upper esophageal sphincter manometry, esophageal manometry, sphincter of Oddi manometry, antroduodenal manometry, and anorectal manometry) require either precise fixation of the pressure sensor at a specific point in the organ, or simultaneous measurement of pressure at several points a defined distance apart, neither of which is achievable with a freely moving radio capsule.

=== pH-sensing capsules ===
pH-sensing radio capsules must operate across roughly 0.8 to 8.5 pH, with a sensitivity of ±0.1–0.2 pH, and maintain stable characteristics for the 2–3 days a capsule typically spends in the digestive tract. The measuring electrode in such a sensor is typically antimony or a glass electrode, with a calomel or silver chloride electrode used as the reference.

Modern acid-related diagnostic methods rely either on simultaneous pH measurement at two or more points in the gastrointestinal tract, on fixing a pH sensor at a specific location (as with 24-hour esophageal pH monitoring, positioned 5 cm above the lower esophageal sphincter), or on measuring pH at a standardized set of points (endoscopic pH mapping), approaches not achievable with a freely moving pH capsule. Currently, in practical medicine, only the Bravo capsule, attached to the esophageal epithelium, sees clinical use among this category.

=== Temperature-sensing capsules ===
Temperature sensors in radio capsules must operate across a range of 34–42 °C, detecting changes as small as ±0.1–0.2 °C.

Since the first radio capsule was developed, several transducer types have been used for temperature sensing:

- ferroelectric ceramic or other capacitors with a strongly temperature-dependent dielectric constant
- inductance coils with a core whose magnetic permeability is sufficiently temperature-dependent to allow measurement
- thermistors
- diodes or transistors with a pronounced temperature dependence of collector current

Such capsules were used to measure the temperature profile of the gastrointestinal tract. Temperature-based methods are not part of the current standard set of functional diagnostic techniques in gastroenterology.

== History ==
=== The development boom of the late 1950s–1960s ===
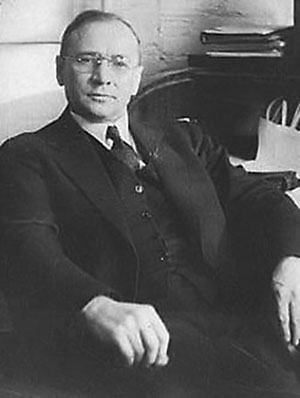
Vladimir Zworykin

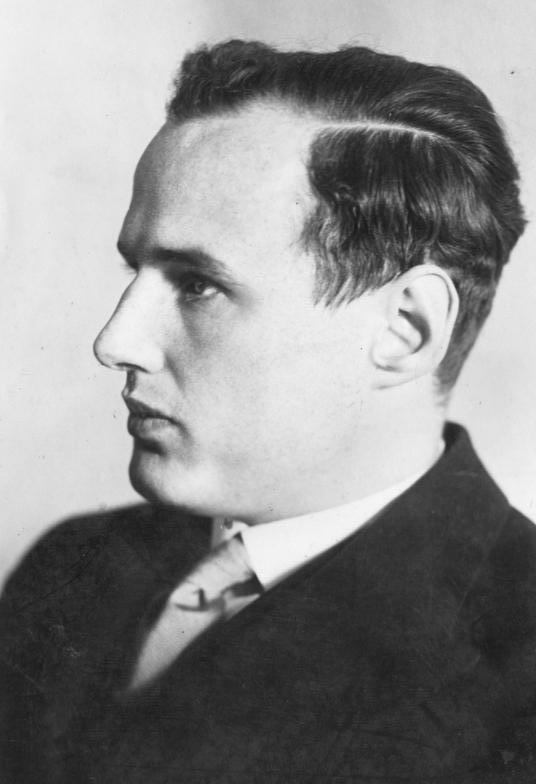
Manfred von Ardenne

The first radio capsule with an independent power source was described in June 1957 in the journal Nature by researchers at the Karolinska Institute (Stockholm, Sweden), R. Stuart Mackay and Bertil Jacobson. This was a freely moving capsule measuring pressure and temperature in the digestive tract.

The Mackay–Jacobson paper marked the start of an international burst of "capsule engineering" activity. That same year, Science published a report on a similar American capsule. The following year, 1958, saw East German and West German capsules appear. In 1960, in the Soviet Union, a specialized laboratory for developing radio capsules and their associated telemetric systems was established in Leningrad. In 1961, English researchers published their own work, followed by Japanese researchers in 1962.

By the late 1950s, the field was considered important enough that some of the era's most prominent inventors personally took up radio-capsule design, including Vladimir Zworykin (United States) and Manfred von Ardenne (East Germany, credited with the first pH-sensing radio capsule).

In the early 1960s, Telefunken (West Germany) provided significant funding for technical experimentation and medical research in this field.

=== Heidelberg capsules ===
"Heidelberg capsules" are single-use radio capsules that measure acidity within the gastrointestinal lumen, named after Heidelberg, Germany. In the early 1960s, at the University of Heidelberg's gastroenterology department, professor of pediatrics Hans G. Nöller, with financial support from Telefunken, conducted over 1,000 studies on adult patients using such capsules over a three-year period.

The term "Heidelberg Capsule" (or "Heidelberg pH Capsule") remains more common in the United States, where Heidelberg Medical Inc. manufactures Heidelberg capsules and associated radiotelemetric systems.

=== Soviet radio capsule development ===
In late 1960, a laboratory was established in Leningrad, within an institution of the USSR Academy of Medical Sciences, with the primary task of developing endoradiosounding equipment. Overall direction of the radio-capsule research was carried out by E. B. Babsky and A. M. Sorin. Physiological and clinical testing of the completed capsules began at the end of 1961. Radio capsules were initially used to study the digestive tract; later, they were also adopted at the Leningrad Institute for Advanced Medical Training to record uterine contractile function and study labor, under S. N. Davydov.

Development proceeded in stages: first, a series of capsules was developed, each measuring a single parameter (pressure, pH, or temperature); this was followed by capsules capable of measuring two or more parameters simultaneously. Soviet designers took the position that radio capsules should be reusable, in contrast, for example, to Hans Nöller's single-use Heidelberg capsules, coating Soviet capsules in an exterior silicone rubber sleeve that served as a replaceable cover, and subjecting them to chemical disinfection between uses.

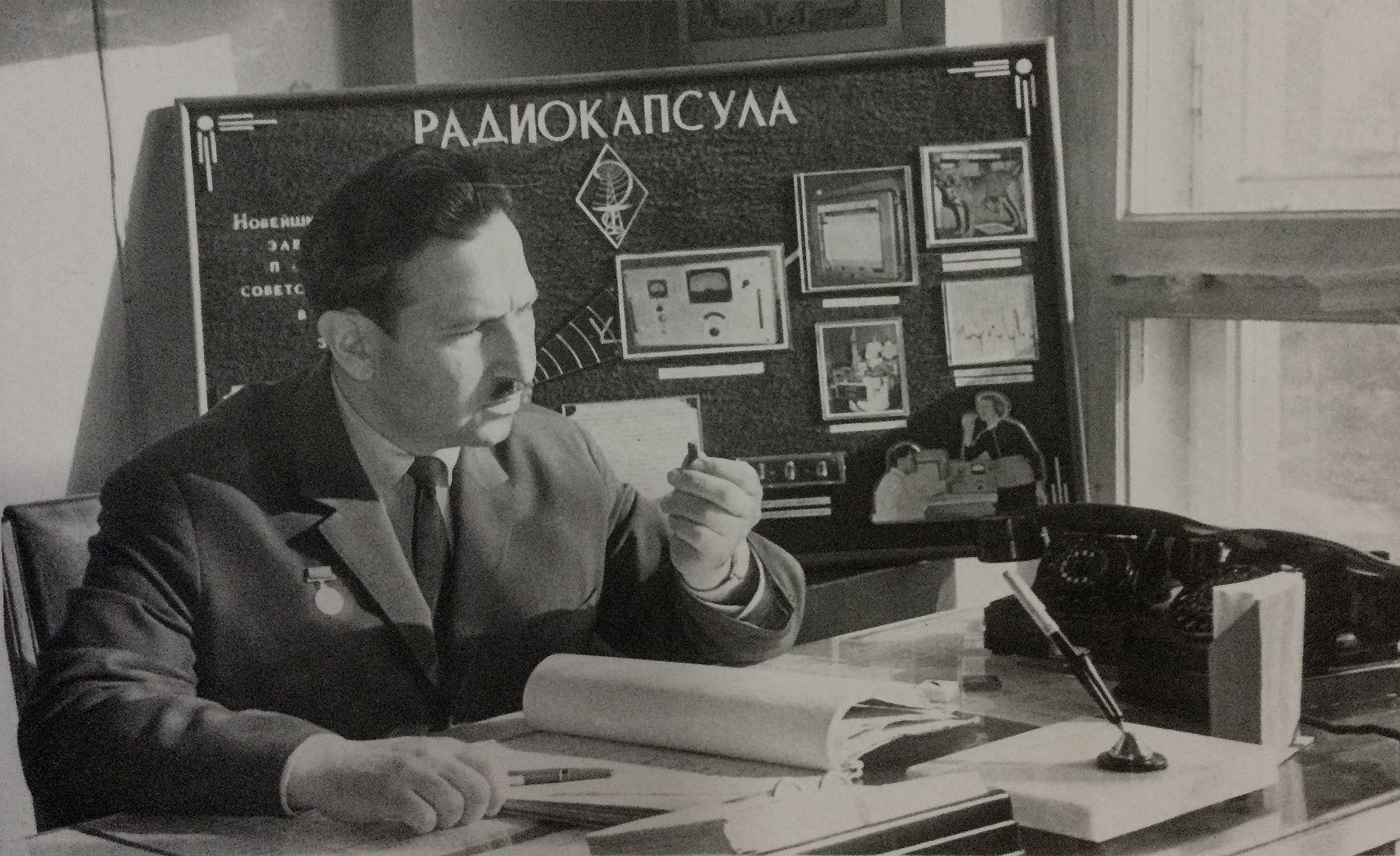
Aron Sorin with radio capsule

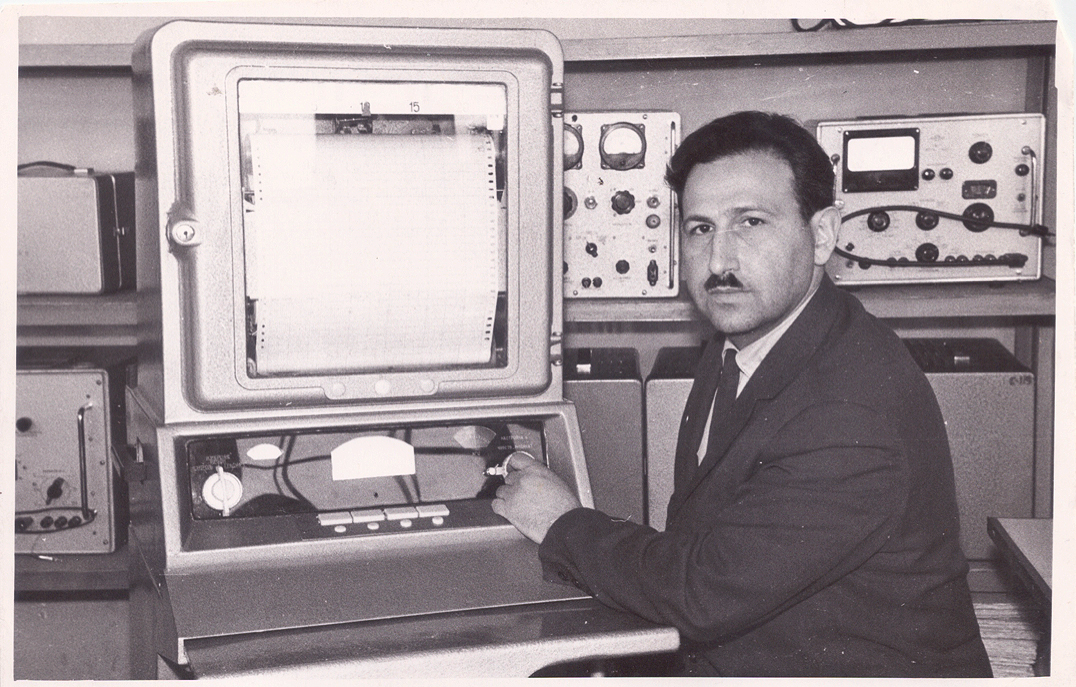
Aron Sorin next to radio capsule receiving unit

==== Soviet pressure-sensing capsules ====
The first versions of Soviet pressure-sensing radio capsules were produced in 1961–62.

==== Soviet pH-sensing capsules ====
Industrial production of the first Soviet pH-metric radio capsules began in 1963. In these capsules, the pH sensor's measuring electrode took the form of an antimony ring, 8 mm in diameter, with a silver lead. The reference electrode was made of chlorinated silver wire, 0.6 mm in diameter, embedded in a paste of equal parts silver chloride (AgCl) and sodium chloride (NaCl). In a later version, the antimony electrode took the form of a disc 5 mm in diameter and 2 mm high, with the reference electrode formed as a 6 mm chlorinated-silver cup; the two electrodes were positioned at opposite ends of the capsule.

Despite this modernization, the pH sensor retained several drawbacks: relatively low sensitivity, rapid oxidation in the stomach's aggressive environment, and temperature dependence. This prompted efforts to develop a glass measuring electrode free of these limitations. By this time, expertise in manufacturing glass electrodes had been built up at the physical chemistry department of Leningrad State University (LGU), where M. M. Shultz — later a full member of the USSR Academy of Sciences and a leading specialist in the field — working with E. Yu. Linar (who specialized in probe-based intragastric pH-metry), developed a glass electrode for intragastric pH measurement. In 1963, a contract was signed with LGU's Research Institute of Chemistry, under which its glass electrochemistry laboratory, led by Shultz, carried out a year-long research project, "Development of Miniature pH Sensors for the Radio Capsule," covering glass-formulation refinement, miniature glass electrode development, and pH sensor testing. A working glass electrode for the pH-metric radio capsule was successfully developed; however, due to difficulties in industrial-scale manufacturing of glass electrodes, A. M. Sorin reverted to the antimony measuring electrode for production capsules.

Soviet pH-sensing radio capsules were widely used in scientific research. For example, the candidate's dissertation of V. T. Ivashkin, later chief gastroenterologist of the Russian Ministry of Health and Social Development and a full member of the Russian Academy of Medical Sciences, was conducted using pH-sensing radio capsules, examining the significance of radiotelemetric measurement of intragastric and intraduodenal pH for evaluating the effectiveness of antacids and atropine in patients with chronic diseases of the stomach and duodenum.

==== Soviet temperature-sensing capsules ====
The radio capsules developed in Sorin's laboratory used, as a temperature sensor, a ferroelectric ceramic capacitor (a "varicond"), initially type VK1-2V and later type K10-21. The sensor took the form of a disc 2 mm in diameter and 0.5 mm thick, achieving a measurement accuracy of 0.1 °C across a range of 34–42 °C.

=== Obstetric, gynecological, and urological research ===
Beyond the gastrointestinal tract, radio capsules were used to study other hollow organs. Research directions included measuring intrauterine pressure in gynecology and obstetrics, measuring pressure in the human vagina and uterus during coitus, and studying pressure inside the urinary bladder.

=== Assessment of the first 15 years ===
From 1957, when the first publications appeared, through the early 1970s, radio capsule development and application methods were pursued enthusiastically in many countries, with widespread belief that radio capsules would become a powerful diagnostic tool. Nearly all of the engineering problems relating to capsule construction, sensors, and signal transmission and processing were solved fairly quickly, and some genuine physiological findings emerged (for example, mapping the pH and temperature profiles of the entire gastrointestinal tract). Several hundred scientific papers were eventually published on the subject. However, the central goal — widespread adoption of radio capsules in routine clinical medicine — was not achieved.

The main reasons were the difficulty (or impossibility) of precisely determining which segment of the gastrointestinal tract a capsule occupied at a given moment, and the impossibility of "stopping" a capsule at a clinically relevant location as it moved through the tract.

== Bravo pH capsule ==
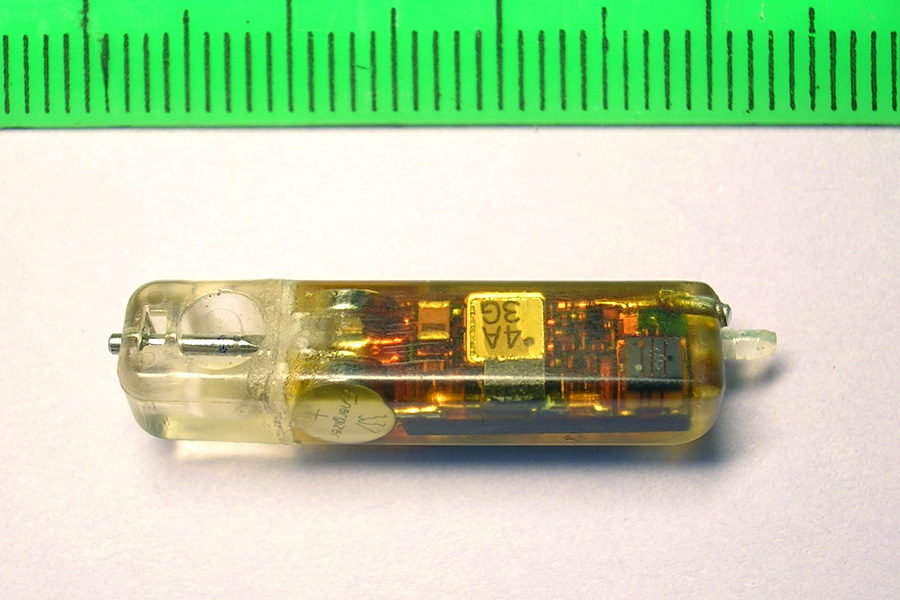
рН-Capsule Bravo

The Bravo pH capsule (Bravo™), manufactured since 2003 by Medtronic (United States), is not a freely moving capsule. Using a delivery device, it is attached to the esophageal epithelium (typically 5 cm above the lower esophageal sphincter), where it measures acidity in the esophageal lumen over several days, transmitting results to a receiver carried in a pocket, worn on a belt, or otherwise attached to the patient's body. After the study, recorded data is transferred to a computer for analysis. The capsule detaches from the esophagus after several days, as the epithelium to which it is attached naturally sheds, and passes out of the body with the stool.

The Bravo capsule is used to investigate gastroesophageal reflux. Its principal advantage over conventional ambulatory pH monitors performing the same task is that the patient can maintain normal daily activity during the (typically 24-hour or longer) study without others being aware a sensor has been placed (patients using conventional pH monitors can also maintain normal activity, but with a visible pH probe passing through the nose into the esophagus).

Despite certain drawbacks (chest discomfort in some patients, the need for endoscopy during capsule placement, early detachment in 5–10% of cases, and cost), and despite modern ambulatory pH monitors having reduced Bravo's earlier advantage in study duration, Bravo pH capsules have become part of routine clinical practice in developed countries for diagnosing esophageal reflux disorders, particularly gastroesophageal reflux disease.

== "Laboratory in a pill" ==
Projects have been undertaken to develop radio capsules, based on more recent electronics, capable of measuring a wider range of gastrointestinal parameters simultaneously. One such project, the "laboratory-in-a-pill," was developed at the University of Glasgow, Scotland.

== Other radioelectronic "pill" and capsule devices ==
A large number of radioelectronic capsules exist for diagnostic or therapeutic purposes. Some are in wide medical use; others are used only in research; some exist only as prototypes or proposed designs. The devices below, while not radio capsules in the strict original sense, share the common feature of being radio-technical or radioelectronic devices in the form of an ingestible capsule that emit radio signals.

=== Video capsule endoscopy ===
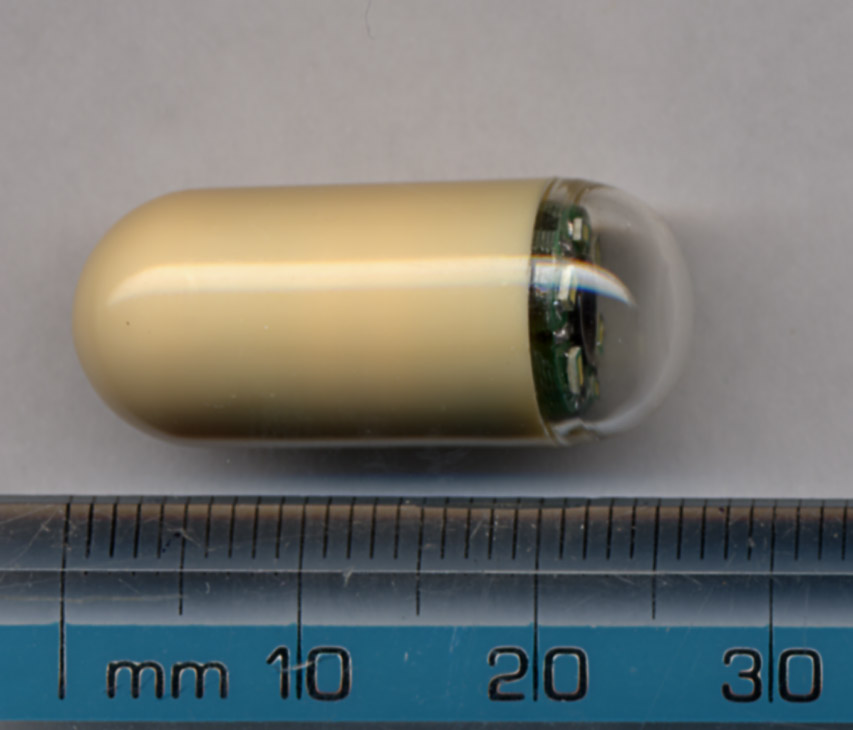
Endoscope capsule

Video capsule endoscopes combine a miniature video camera with a video-signal transmitter, embedded in a capsule. The diagnostic procedure using such a capsule is called capsule endoscopy. As the capsule passes through the gastrointestinal tract, it takes tens of thousands of images, stored in the memory of a receiving unit similar to that used with other radio capsules. Capsule endoscopy has made it possible to image portions of the small intestine previously inaccessible to endoscopy, and is a certified diagnostic method in the United States, the European Union, Israel, and Australia.

==== Limitations of video capsule endoscopy ====
Capsule endoscopy does not allow tissue sampling for histological examination (biopsy), unlike conventional endoscopy.

The video capsule may also be retained within the patient's gastrointestinal tract, occurring, by various estimates, in 0.5–10% of procedures. In such cases, the capsule is removed either endoscopically or via surgery.

=== "Kremlin pills" (gastrointestinal electrostimulators) ===
Autonomous gastrointestinal electrostimulators (АЭС ЖКТ), also known as "Kremlin pills," resemble radio capsules externally but, unlike radio capsules, are therapeutic rather than diagnostic active devices. As such a device passes through the digestive tract, it generates electrical impulses that produce a stimulating and physiotherapeutic effect on surrounding organs. It was developed by V. F. Agafonnikov (Tomsk Institute of Automated Control Systems and Radioelectronics) and V. V. Pekarsky (Tomsk Medical Institute) in Tomsk in 1984. Serial production began at a workshop of the Tomsk Institute of Automated Control Systems and Radioelectronics in 1986, and has been produced since 1996 by the Tomsk Research Institute of Semiconductor Devices.
