= Medical procedure =

Action to achieve a result in the delivery of healthcare

A medical procedure is a course of action intended to achieve a result in the delivery of healthcare.

A medical procedure with the intention of determining, measuring, or diagnosing a patient condition or parameter is also called a medical test. Other common kinds of procedures are therapeutic (i.e., intended to treat, cure, or restore function or structure), such as surgical and physical rehabilitation procedures.

== Definition ==
- "An activity directed at or performed on an individual with the object of improving health, treating disease or injury, or making a diagnosis." - International Dictionary of Medicine and Biology
- "The act or conduct of diagnosis, treatment, or operation." - Stedman's Medical Dictionary by Thomas Lathrop Stedman
- "A series of steps by which a desired result is accomplished." - Dorland's Medical Dictionary by William Alexander Newman Dorland
- "The sequence of steps to be followed in establishing some course of action." - Mosby's Medical, Nursing, & Allied Health Dictionary

== List of medical procedures ==
=== Propaedeutic ===
- Auscultation
- Medical inspection (body features)
- Palpation
- Percussion (medicine)
- Vital signs measurement, such as blood pressure, body temperature, or pulse (or heart rate)

=== Diagnostic ===
- Lab tests
  - Biopsy test
  - Blood test
  - Stool test
  - Urinalysis
- Cardiac stress test
- Electrocardiography
- Electrocorticography
- Electroencephalography
- Electromyography
- Electroneuronography
- Electronystagmography
- Electrooculography
- Electroretinography
- Endoluminal capsule monitoring
- Endoscopy
  - Colonoscopy
  - Colposcopy
  - Cystoscopy
  - Gastroscopy
  - Laparoscopy
  - Laryngoscopy
  - Ophthalmoscopy
  - Otoscopy
  - Sigmoidoscopy
- Esophageal motility study
- Evoked potential
- Magnetoencephalography
- Medical imaging
  - Angiography
    - Aortography
    - Cerebral angiography
    - Coronary angiography
    - Lymphangiography
    - Pulmonary angiography
    - Ventriculography
  - Chest photofluorography
  - Computed tomography
  - Echocardiography
  - Electrical impedance tomography
  - Fluoroscopy
  - Magnetic resonance imaging
    - Diffuse optical imaging
    - Diffusion tensor imaging
    - Diffusion-weighted imaging
    - Functional magnetic resonance imaging
  - Positron emission tomography
  - Radiography
  - Scintillography
  - SPECT
  - Ultrasonography
    - Contrast-enhanced ultrasound
    - Gynecologic ultrasonography
    - Intravascular ultrasound
    - Obstetric ultrasonography
  - Thermography
  - Virtual colonoscopy
- Neuroimaging
- Posturography

=== Therapeutic ===
- Thrombosis prophylaxis
- Precordial thump
- Politzerization
- Hemodialysis
- Hemofiltration
- Plasmapheresis
- Apheresis
- Extracorporeal membrane oxygenation (ECMO)
- Cancer immunotherapy
- Cancer vaccine
- Cervical conization
- Chemotherapy
- Cytoluminescent therapy
- Insulin potentiation therapy
- Low-dose chemotherapy
- Monoclonal antibody therapy
- Photodynamic therapy
- Radiation therapy
- Targeted therapy
- Tracheal intubation
- Unsealed source radiotherapy
- Virtual reality therapy
- Physical therapy/Physiotherapy
- Speech therapy
- Phototerapy
- Hydrotherapy
- Heat therapy
- Shock therapy
  - Insulin shock therapy
  - Electroconvulsive therapy
  - Symptomatic treatment
- Fluid replacement therapy
- Palliative care
- Hyperbaric oxygen therapy
- Oxygen therapy
- Gene therapy
- Enzyme replacement therapy
- Intravenous therapy
- Phage therapy
- Respiratory therapy
- Vision therapy
- Electrotherapy
- Transcutaneous electrical nerve stimulation (TENS)
- Laser therapy
- Combination therapy
- Occupational therapy
- Immunization
- Vaccination
- Immunosuppressive therapy
- Psychotherapy
- Drug therapy
- Acupuncture
- Antivenom
- Magnetic therapy
- Craniosacral therapy
- Chelation therapy
- Hormonal therapy
- Hormone replacement therapy
- Opiate replacement therapy
- Cell therapy
- Stem cell treatments
- Intubation
- Nebulization
- Inhalation therapy
- Particle therapy
- Proton therapy
- Fluoride therapy
- Cold compression therapy
- Animal-Assisted Therapy
- Negative Pressure Wound Therapy
- Nicotine replacement therapy
- Oral rehydration therapy

=== Surgical ===
- Ablation
- Amputation
- Biopsy
- Cardiopulmonary resuscitation (CPR)
- Cryosurgery
- Endoscopic surgery
- Facial rejuvenation
- General surgery
- Hand surgery
- Hemilaminectomy
- Image-guided surgery
- Knee cartilage replacement therapy
- Laminectomy
- Laparoscopic surgery
- Lithotomy
- Lithotriptor
- Lobotomy
- Neovaginoplasty
- Radiosurgery
- Stereotactic surgery
- Vaginoplasty
- Xenotransplantation

=== Anesthesia ===
- Dissociative anesthesia
- General anesthesia
- Local anesthesia
  - Topical anesthesia (surface)
  - Epidural (extradural) block
  - Spinal anesthesia (subarachnoid block)
- Regional anesthesia

=== Other ===
- Interventional radiology
- Screening (medicine)

== See also ==
- Algorithm (medical)
- Autopsy
- Complication (medicine)
- Consensus (medical)
- Contraindication
- Course (medicine)
- Drug interaction
- Extracorporeal
- Guideline (medical)
- Iatrogenesis
- Invasive (medical)
- List of surgical instruments
- Medical error
- Medical prescription
- Medical test
- Minimally invasive
- Nocebo
- Non-invasive
- Physical examination
- Responsible drug use
- Surgical instruments
- Vital signs
