= Chodorov =

Chodorov is a surname. Notable people with the surname include:

- Edward Chodorov (1904–1988), American playwright, screenwriter, and film producer
- Frank Chodorov (1887–1966), American libertarian, author of The Income Tax: Root of All Evil
- Jerome Chodorov (1911–2004), American playwright and librettist

== See also ==
- Chodorow
- Khodorov (disambiguation)
