= Boris Khodorov =

- Born: 17 January 1922; Kerch, Crimean ASSR
- Died: 5 July 2014 (aged 92)
- Education: Tashkent State Medicine Academy

Boris Khodorov (Russian: Борис Израилевич Ходоров, b. 17 January 1922 – d. 5 July 2014) was a Soviet and Russian physiologist, M.D., D.Sc., professor of physiology, and head of the Cell Physiology section of Moscow Physiological Society (formerly the Pavlov All-USSR Society of Physiologists; Russian: Всесоюзное Физиологическое общество имени И. П. Павлова).

== Biography ==
Boris Israelevitch Khodorov was born in Kerch, on 17 January 1922. He graduated from Tashkent Medical Institute (Tashkent State Medicine Academy) in 1944 and then served with distinction as senior doctor in the Howitzer Artillery Regiment of the First Byelorussian Front in Byelorussia, Poland, and Germany. In 1946, Khodorov was dismissed from the Red Army and started his scientific career in Moscow as a research assistant at the V.I. Lenin Moscow State Pedagogical University (1946-1953). There he received his PhD in biology (1949). After dismissal of the Jewish staff, Khodorov joined the Vishnevsky Institute of Surgery of the USSR Academy of Medical Sciences., where he served as a senior research scientist and then the head of the Laboratory of Biophysical Studies (1957-1988). He moved again to the Institute of General Pathology and Pathophysiology as a Senior Research Scientist (1988-2014). There in 2001 he founded the Laboratory of Ion Transport Pathology and Intracellular Signaling.

== Scientific contributions ==
Khodorov published over 175 research papers and books, mostly concerning ion channels and membrane electrical excitability. He trained many successful scientists who hold faculty positions in universities all over the world. Initially at the V.I. Lenin Moscow State Pedagogical University, like other Soviet neurobiologists he was required to work on Pavlovian conditioning. After Soviet science was liberalized in the 1960s, he moved to ion channels, developing as a leader in the actions of local anesthetics and toxins on membrane excitability and building up one of the three principal centers of ion channel research in the Soviet Union. At the Vishnevsky Institute of Surgery, the Khodorov laboratory carried out pioneering studies in the field of ion channel biophysics, recording electrical activities from the nodes of Ranvier, studying the mechanisms of C-type inactivation in voltage-gated ion channels and the effects of neurotoxins and local anesthetics on membrane excitability. Subsequently, at the Institute of General Pathology and Pathophysiology[3], he studied structure and function of the NMDA-subtype of ionotropic glutamate receptors, focusing on the mechanisms of gating and ion channel block. At the same time, in collaboration with the laboratories of Dr. Pinelis at the Institute of Pediatrics (Moscow, Russia) and Dr. Duchen at the University College London, Khodorov was studying calcium homeostasis, glutamate excitotoxicity and mitochondrial dysfunction in neurons. He was a member of a number of editorial boards including that of the journal Membrane and Cell Biology.

== Personal life ==
He was married in 1949 to Faina Sheykhon, physiologist, and they had one child Alla born in 1954.

In 1985 Boris Khodorov was awarded the USSR State Prize.

== Publications ==
- Sobolevsky, Alexander I.; Koshelev, Sergey G.; Khodorov, Boris I. (December 1999). "Probing of NMDA Channels with Fast Blockers". The Journal of Neuroscience. 19 (24): 10611–10626. doi:10.1523/JNEUROSCI.19-24-10611.1999. PMC 6784965. PMID 10594045.
- Khodorov, B.; Pinelis, V.; Vergun, O.; Storozhevykh, T.; Vinskaya, N. (November 1996). "Mitochondrial deenergization underlies neuronal calcium overload following a prolonged glutamate challenge". FEBS Lett. 397 (2–3): 230–234. doi:10.1016/S0014-5793(96)01139-8. PMID 8955353.
- Babsky, Evgeni; Boris Khodorov; Grigory Kositsky; Anatoly Zubkov (1989). Evgeni Babsky (ed.). Human Physiology, in 2 vols. Translated by Ludmila Aksenova. Translation edited by H. C. Creighton (M.A., Oxon). Moscow: Mir Publishers. ISBN 978-5-03-000776-2. First published in Russian as «Физиология человека»
