= Aron Meerovich Sorin =

Soviet engineer and inventor (1925–1975)

Aron Sorin
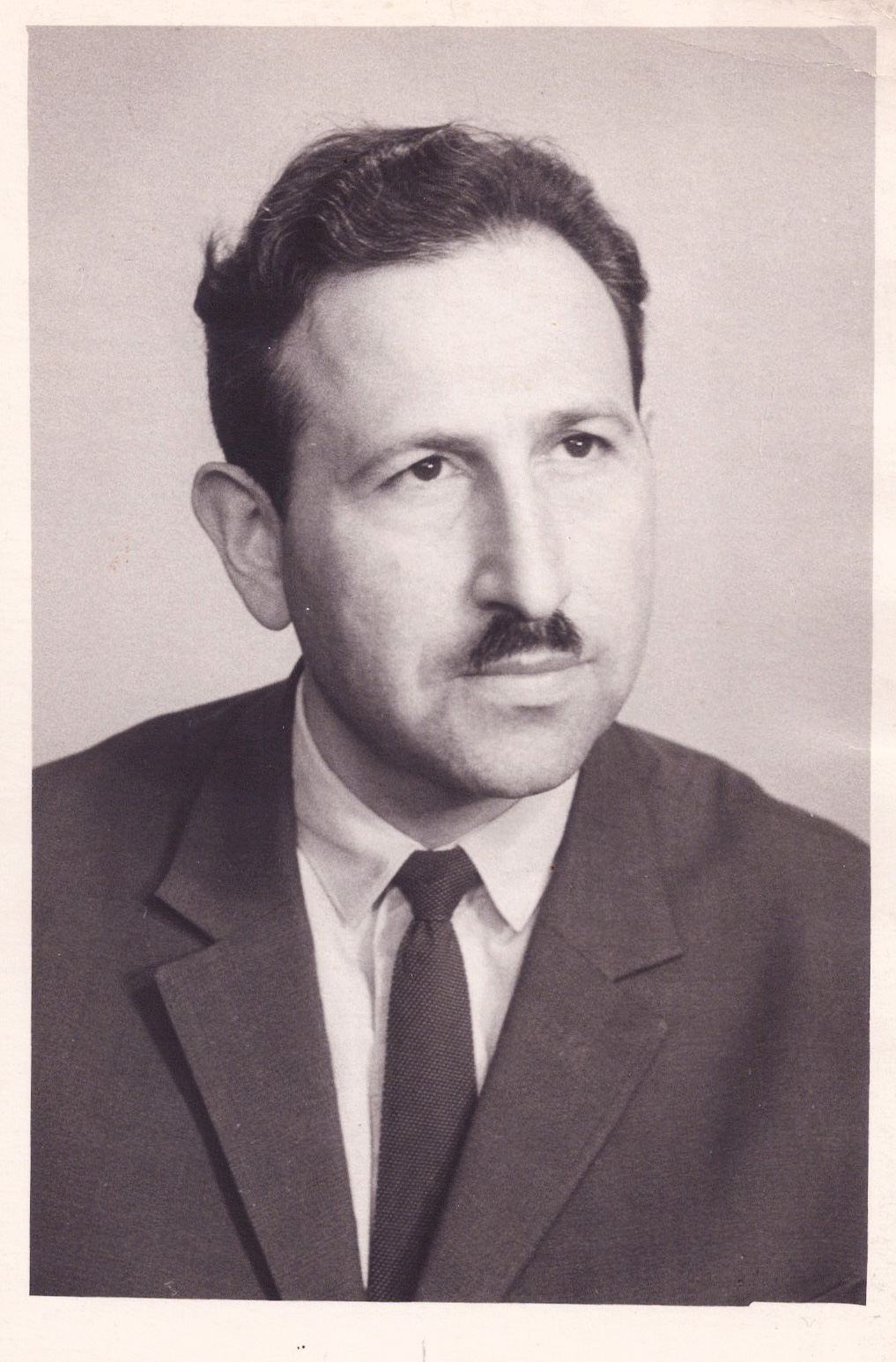
- Born: Aron Meerovich Sorin; January 24, 1925; Vitebsk, Byelorussian SSR, Soviet Union
- Died: August 15, 1975 (aged 50)
- Occupations: Engineer, inventor
- Known for: Development of the radio capsule
- Spouse: Irina Sorin (Zeldin)

Aron Meerovich Sorin (Russian: Арон Меерович Сорин; 24 January 1925 – 15 August 1975) was a Soviet engineer and inventor whose research focused on the development of radiotelemetric systems. His principal achievement was leading the development of the Soviet medical radio capsule ("radiopill"), a miniature swallowable radio transmitter used to remotely measure physiological parameters within the body.

== Early life and naval service ==
Sorin was born on 24 January 1925 in Vitebsk to Jewish parents, Meer Mendl Zalmanovich Sorin and Basya Haimovna Sorina (née Berezina), the second of three children. In 1931 the family moved to Leningrad.

At age 15 he was admitted to the 2nd Leningrad Special Naval School, one of seven specialized naval preparatory schools established by the Soviet government in 1940 to train candidates for naval academies.

At the outbreak of the World War II, the school's senior classes were mobilized for military service, while the younger students spent the first winter of the Siege of Leningrad extinguishing incendiary bombs on rooftops and clearing rubble after air raids. Because of severe malnutrition, Sorin was unable to evacuate with the school to Tara after the Road of Life was opened in the winter of 1942, and was instead evacuated with his family.

Upon his return to Leningrad in 1944, he enrolled at the Leningrad Higher Engineering Marine School named after Admiral S. O. Makarov.

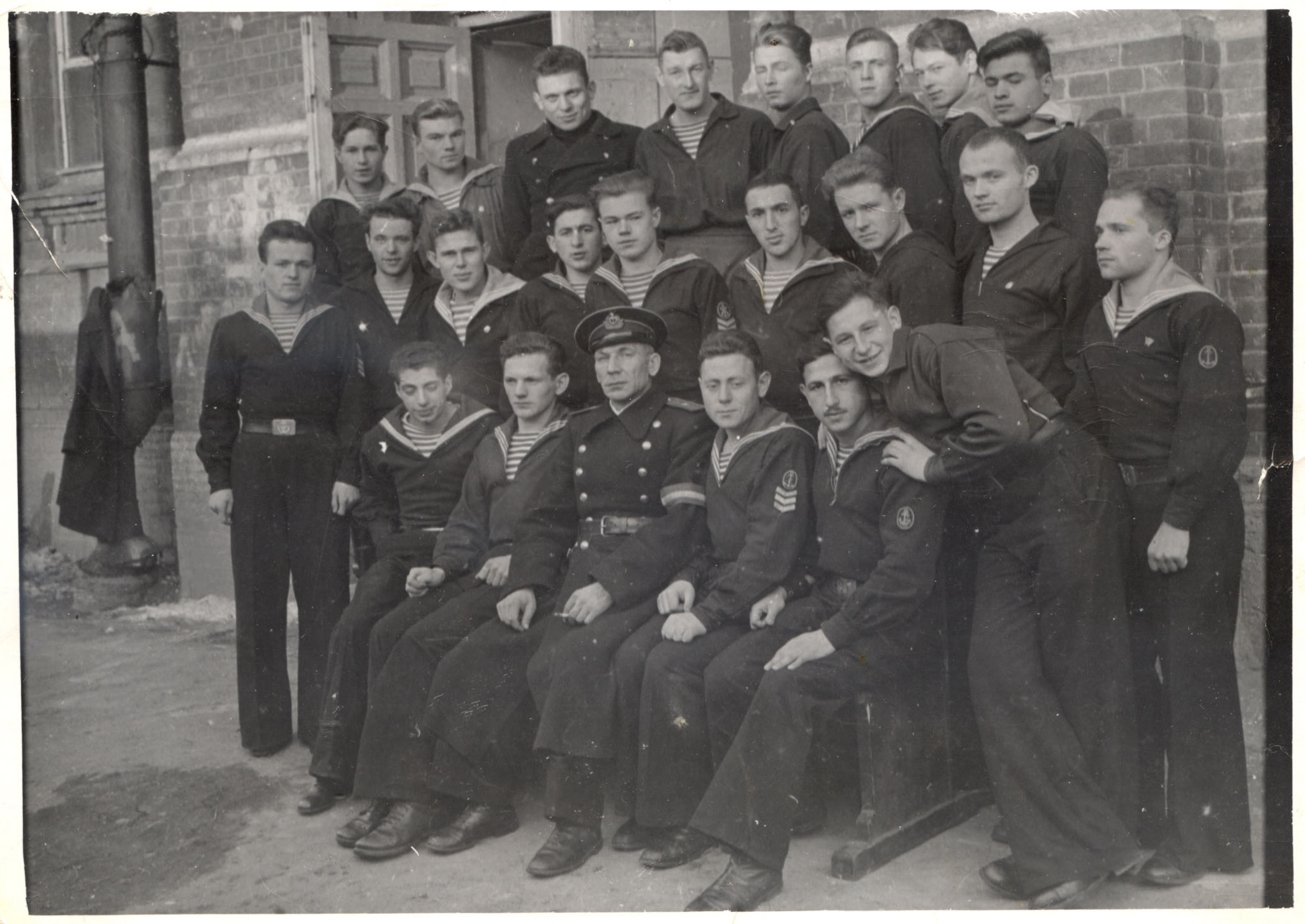
Graduates of the Leningrad Higher Engineering Marine School (LVIMU). Aron Sorin (seated) and Mailen Konstantinovsky (standing) are the first and second from the right in the front row.

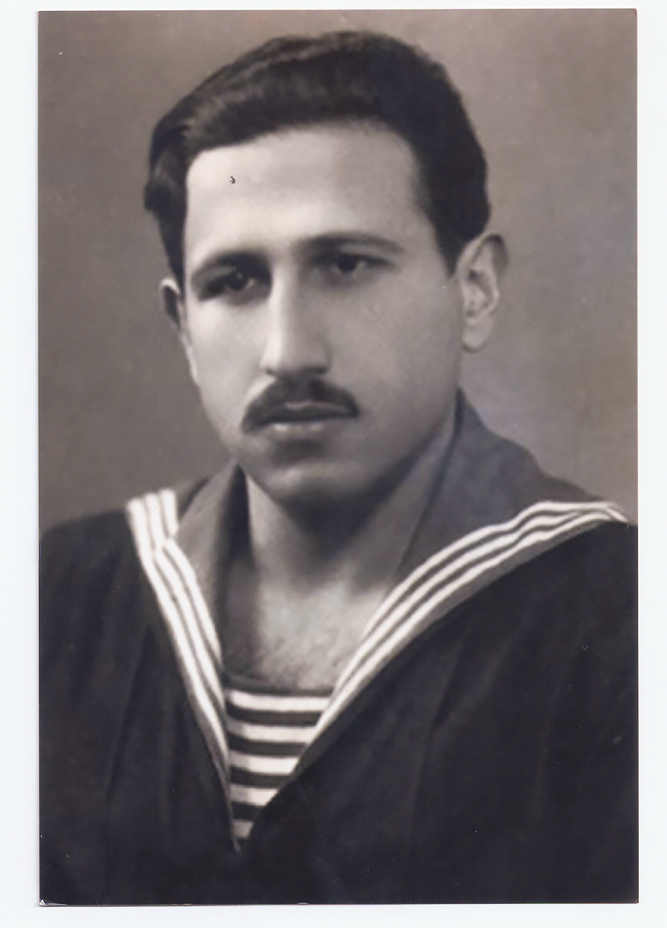
Aron Meerovich Sorin during maritime service

After graduating, he worked as a ship radio engineer, publishing on radio equipment design, while traveling to the United States, Cuba, and ports across Europe.

== Medical radioelectronics ==
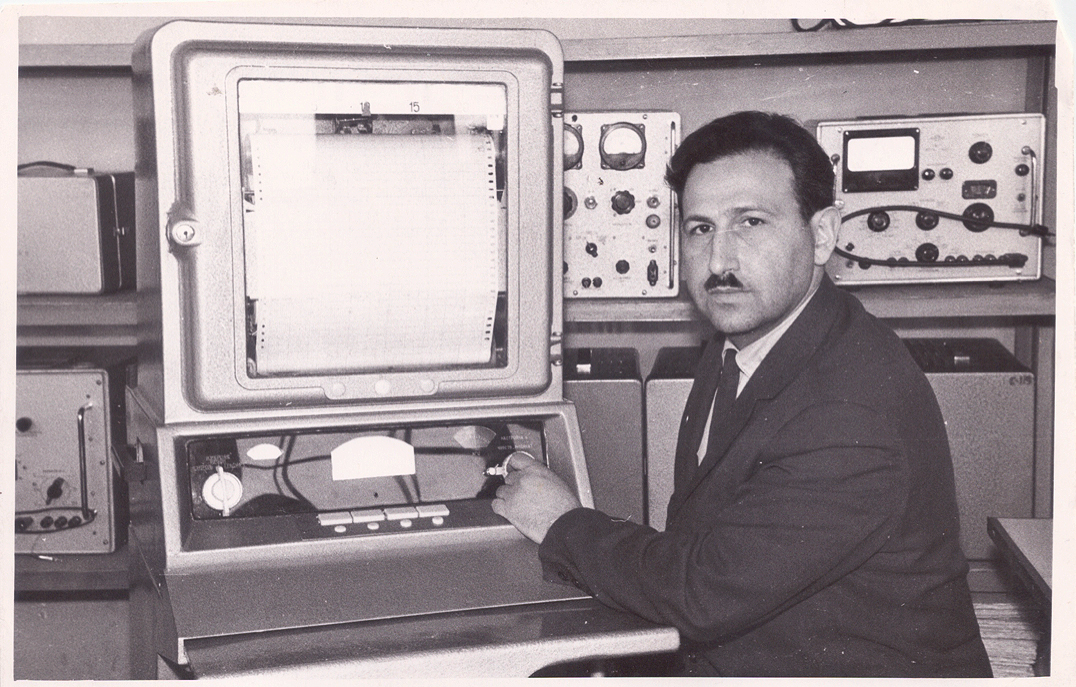
Aron Meerovich Sorin in his laboratory next to capsule receiver device

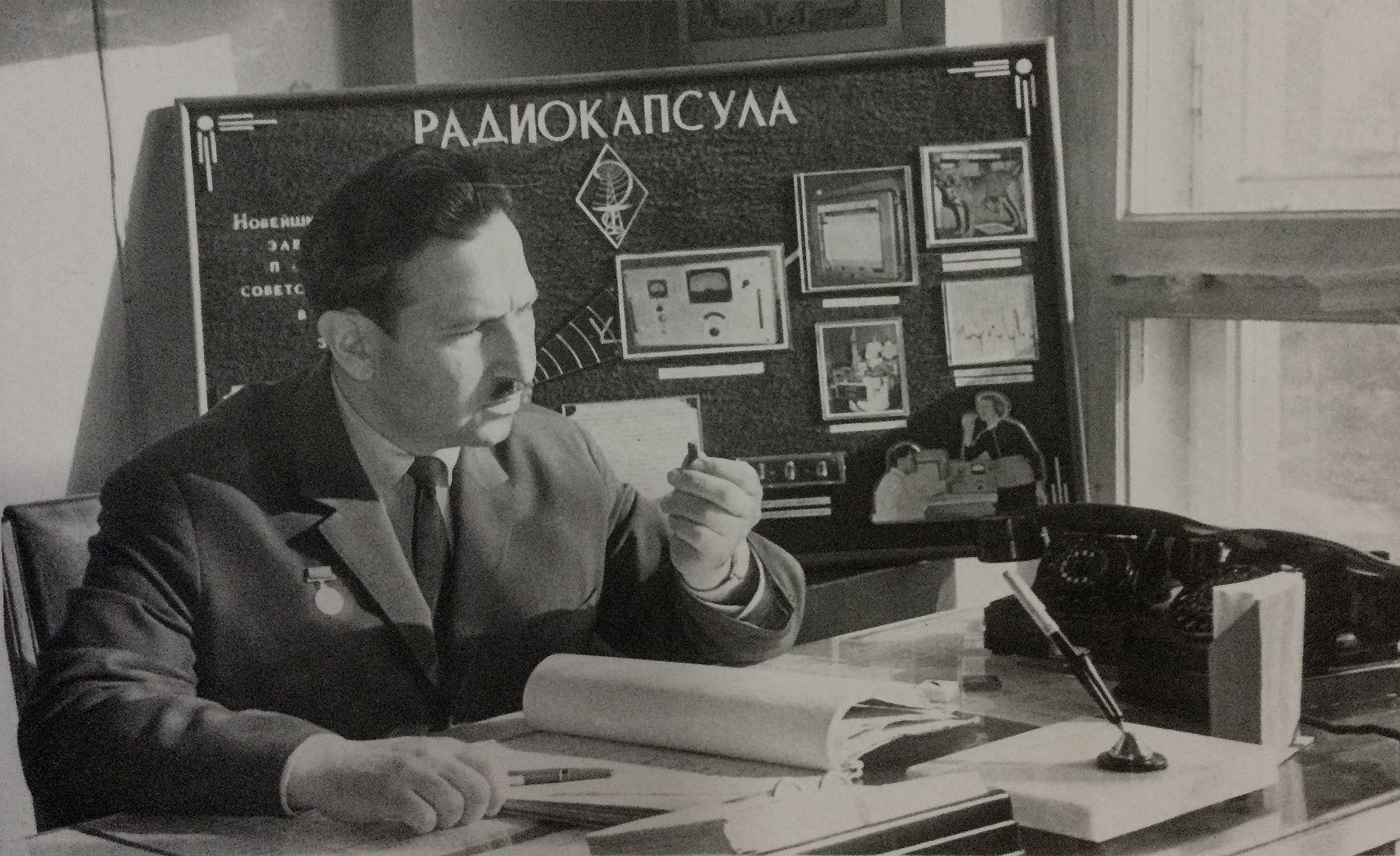
Aron Meerovich Sorin with a radio capsule

Following his retirement from the Soviet Navy in 1955, Sorin became head of the Leningrad Laboratory of Medical Radioelectronics, where he led research on ingestible radio capsules (endoradiosondes). The rapid institutionalization of cybernetics in the Soviet Union during the late 1950s was accompanied by growing interest in medical radioelectronics, regarded as one of many emerging interdisciplinary branches of cybernetics.

Under the leadership of Aksel Berg, the Academy of Sciences established the Scientific Council on Cybernetics, which included a biomedical section bringing together physiologists, engineers, and physicians. Among its early members was the physiologist and Academy of Sciences member Evgeny Babsky, a principal academic collaborator of Sorin's laboratory and co-author of several of its major publications. Clinical research was conducted through the laboratory's affiliation with the Research Institute of Normal and Pathological Physiology, which provided access to experimental and clinical testing.

International interest in ingestible telemetry developed concurrently. In the United States, Vladimir K. Zworykin participated in research on radio capsules during the early 1960s, while Soviet and American advances in cybernetics and medical radioelectronics were closely monitored by both countries.

=== Development of the radio capsule ===
Work on the first Soviet radiotelemetric system with a pH-measuring radio capsule began in 1960 under the leadership of Babsky and Sorin, with trials carried out in 1961–62. Another historical account identifies 1962 as the year of the system's introduction under Sorin's leadership.

The laboratory went on to develop a family of radio capsules for measuring physiological parameters within the digestive tract, progressing from single-parameter devices for pressure, pH, and temperature to capsules capable of recording multiple parameters simultaneously. The first Soviet pressure-sensing capsules were produced in 1961–62, followed by industrial production of pH-sensing capsules in 1963. The laboratory also developed a temperature-sensing capsule based on a ferroelectric ceramic capacitor ("varikond"), capable of measuring gastrointestinal temperature with an accuracy of approximately ±0.1 °C.

The capsules enabled continuous measurement of pressure, temperature, and pH throughout the digestive tract under near-normal physiological conditions, avoiding many of the limitations of conventional probes and surgically prepared experimental models. The pH-sensing capsule was further adapted for functional assessment of gastric secretory activity and independently validated against conventional electrometric measurements in preclinical experiments.

The technology came into wide use in the Soviet Union during the 1960s and 1970s, and in some major Soviet clinics radiotelemetric pH measurement became a routine component of clinical examination. Reviewing the development of the field, Yakovlev identifies Sorin among the principal investigators whose work between 1962 and 1969 established the radiotelemetric study of intragastric acidity. He describes radiotelemetric pH measurement as the most advanced technology for gastroduodenal pH investigation from the 1960s through the 1980s and notes that its underlying concept was later continued in radiotelemetric pH capsules produced by Medtronic for oesophageal pH monitoring.

=== Capsule localization ===
Establishing the position of a capsule within the digestive tract was a central problem because physiological measurements could not be interpreted without knowing the capsule's location. Organ describes accurate localization as one of the principal technical challenges of radiotelemetric investigation, while later reviews likewise identified capsule localization as one of the major practical limitations of endoradiosounding. Sorin and Yu. S. Zhukov developed a radio direction-finding system that enabled the position and movement of a capsule within the digestive tract to be tracked during physiological studies.

=== Applications beyond gastroenterology ===
In collaboration with the obstetrician S. N. Davydov, Sorin adapted the laboratory's radio capsule technology for continuous measurement of intrauterine pressure during labor and for research on the function of the reproductive tract. The collaboration continued for more than a decade, culminating in the publication of the laboratory's 1975 monograph.

In the 1975 monograph, endoradiosounding is described as a method capable of providing physiological information unavailable through contemporary clinical techniques while causing minimal disturbance to normal bodily function. They identified further miniaturization, passive capsule designs, improved localization methods, and portable receiving equipment as priorities for future development, describing the field as still in its infancy while anticipating its broader application in clinical and experimental physiology.

== Popular science ==
Sorin's work on medical radioelectronics was featured in Soviet popular science publications, including the magazine Radio and Mailen Konstantinovsky's children's science-fiction series KOAPP.

The August 1964 issue of Radio featured an article titled "Radio Pills" (Радиопилюли), introducing Sorin's work in medical radioelectronics to a readership of radio enthusiasts and technically minded readers interested in emerging scientific and technological developments.

In the sixth volume of Konstantinovsky's KOAPP series, a dog character humorously recounts testing an early experimental medical radio capsule, mentioning "Engineer Sorin" and the Leningrad Laboratory of Medical Radioelectronics by name and introducing young readers to the ideas behind bionics, cybernetics, and endoradiosounding.

== Personal life ==
Sorin married Irina Sorin (née Zeldin) in 1956. He died on 15 August 1975, aged 50 and is buried at the Southern Cemetery in Saint Petersburg.

== Selected bibliography ==
- Sorin, A. M. (1957). "Модернизация аварийного радиопередатчика типа АСП" [Modernizing the ASP-type emergency radio transmitter]. Судостроение [Sudostroenie] (in Russian) (6): 29–31.
- Sorin, A. M. (1962). "Радиотелеметрическая система с миниатюрными радиокапсулами для медицинских исследований" [A radiotelemetric system with miniature radio capsules for medical research]. Обмен опытом в радиоэлектронной промышленности [Exchange of Experience in the Radio-Electronic Industry] (in Russian) (12).
- Sorin, A. M. (1962). "Радиотелеметрическая система для исследований желудочно-кишечного тракта человека" [Radiotelemetric system for investigations of the human gastrointestinal tract]. Тезисы докладов 2-й Всесоюзной конференции по применению радиоэлектроники в биологии и медицине [Abstracts of the 2nd All-Union Conference on the Use of Radioelectronics in Biology and Medicine] (in Russian). Moscow. p. 62.
- Babsky, E. B.; Sorin, A. M.; Belousov, A. S.; Zhukov, Yu. S.; Dimanis, V. I. (1963). "Радиотелеметрическое исследование температуры в пищеварительном тракте" [Radiotelemetric study of temperature in the digestive tract]. Доклады Академии наук СССР [Doklady Akademii Nauk SSSR] (in Russian). 149 (5): 1213–1216.
- Sorin, A. M. (1963). "Радиотелеметрическая методика исследования желудочно-кишечного тракта" [Radiotelemetric method for investigating the gastrointestinal tract]. Биологическая и медицинская электроника [Biological and Medical Electronics] (in Russian) (6).
- Babsky, E. B.; Sorin, A. M.; Belousov, A. S.; Malkiman, I. I.; Nesterova, A. P. (1964). "Радиотелеметрическое исследование pH в пищеварительном тракте" [Radiotelemetric study of pH in the digestive tract]. Доклады Академии наук СССР [Doklady Akademii Nauk SSSR] (in Russian). 156 (1): 222–224.
- Babsky, E. B.; Sorin, A. M.; Belousov, A. S.; Dimanis, V. I.; Malkiman, I. I. (1964). "Радиотелеметрическое исследование давления в пищеварительном тракте человека" [Radiotelemetric study of pressure in the human digestive tract]. Доклады Академии наук СССР [Doklady Akademii Nauk SSSR] (in Russian). 158 (4): 993–996.
- Babsky, E.; Sorin, A. (1964). "Радиопилюли" [Radio pills]. Радио: ежемесячный научно-популярный радиотехнический журнал [Radio: Monthly Popular Science Radio Engineering Journal] (in Russian). No. 8.
- Sorin, A. M. (1969). "Радиокапсулы" [Radio capsules]. Методы сбора и анализа физиологической информации [Methods for Collecting and Analyzing Physiological Information] (in Russian). Moscow: Nauka.
- Babsky, E. B.; Sorin, A. M.; Davydov, S. N. (1975). Приборы эндорадиозондирования. Основы конструирования. Техника применения [Instruments for Endoradiosounding: Fundamentals of Design, Application Techniques] (in Russian). Moscow: Nauka.
