= Evgeni Babsky =

Soviet physiologist (1902–1973)

- Born: 28 January 1902 (O.S. 15 January); Goris, Elizavetpol Governorate, Russian Empire
- Died: 10 September 1973 (aged 71); Moscow, Soviet Union
- Citizenship: Soviet
- Education: Moscow State University (graduated 1924)
- Known for: Dynamocardiography; Soviet medical radiotelemetry (endoradiosounding)
- Scientific career
- Fields: Physiology
- Workplaces: Timiryazev Biological Institute; All-Union Institute of Experimental Medicine; Bogomolets Institute of Physiology, Kyiv; Institute of Normal and Pathological Physiology, USSR Academy of Medical Sciences

Evgeni Babsky (Russian: Евгений Борисович Бабский; 28 January 1902 – 10 September 1973) was a Soviet physiologist and experimental scientist. He earned his D.Sc. in 1939 and was elected a member of the Ukrainian Academy of Sciences in 1948.

Babsky is best known for developing dynamocardiography, a clinical method of studying cardiac activity through the registration of chest-wall movements caused by the heartbeat, first introduced in 1951 and widely adopted as a differential-diagnosis tool for mitral valve disorders. In his later career, he led Soviet research into medical radiotelemetry, directing the development of miniature swallowable "radio capsules" used to study pressure, acidity, and temperature in the human digestive tract.

== Biography ==
Babsky was born on 28 January 1902 in Goris. While still a student, he became interested in physiology and taught the subject at the Sverdlov Communist University from 1922 to 1924. He graduated from the medical faculty of Moscow State University in 1924.

After graduation, Babsky worked in the physiology department of the Timiryazev Biological Institute under academician Ivan Razenkov, and subsequently in the physiological laboratory of the Institute of Occupational Diseases named after V. A. Obukh. His earliest research concerned the physiology of the digestive system, including the mechanism of the vomiting reflex and intestinal motility.

From 1930 to 1949, Babsky headed the physiology department at 2nd Moscow State University, later reorganized as the Lenin Moscow State Pedagogical Institute. In 1932 he was confirmed as a professor, and in 1933 he additionally became head of the neurophysiology laboratory at the All-Union Institute of Experimental Medicine. He earned his D.Sc. in 1939. During this period his research focused on neurohumoral regulation, particularly the chemical basis of excitation transmission in nerve and muscle fibers.

This work was interrupted by the Great Patriotic War. From 1941 to 1942, Babsky served as chief of a hospital, and subsequently as an assistant to the plenipotentiary of the State Defense Committee responsible for applying scientific advances in medicine and biology to defense needs. After the war, he resumed research into the chemical mechanisms of nerve and muscle excitation, focusing particularly on the role of acetylcholine and ATP, conducted in close collaboration with staff of the Institute of Biological and Medical Chemistry, AMN SSSR.

In 1948, Babsky was elected a member of the Academy of Sciences of the Ukrainian SSR. In early 1949 he moved to Kyiv to head the Department of General Physiology at the Bogomolets Institute of Physiology. He returned to Moscow at the end of 1950, where he spent the following 22 years as head of the Laboratory of Clinical Physiology at the Institute of Normal and Pathological Physiology, USSR Academy of Medical Sciences.

Following his return to Moscow, Babsky set out to develop new methods of studying physiological processes based on the electrical measurement of mechanical quantities. This work led, in 1951, to the development of dynamocardiography (DCG), a method based on recording the displacement of the chest's center of gravity resulting from cardiac activity. DCG quickly became a valuable tool for differentiating mitral insufficiency from mitral stenosis at a time when cardiac ultrasound was not yet in clinical use, and also allowed physicians to determine the duration of phases of cardiac contraction (phase analysis). Babsky's clinical experience with DCG was summarized in his monograph Dynamocardiography, which became a standard reference for cardiologists and received international recognition.

Babsky was the first Soviet physiologist to draw attention to the clinical potential of cardiac electrical stimulation. In the course of studying cardiac automaticity, he discovered the phenomenon of suppression of potential pacemakers under high-frequency stimulating impulses, and was the first to demonstrate the dynamics of a number of oxidative and glycolytic enzymes in the myocardium across different phases of the cardiac cycle.

For a number of years, Babsky chaired the Scientific-Technical Committee of the USSR Ministry of Health, overseeing the technical modernization of Soviet medicine and the equipping of research and clinical institutions with electronic instruments; under his leadership, devices including an electromanometer, electroplethysmograph, electrosphygmograph, cardiocyclograph, and ballistodynamocardiograph were developed.

In his later career, Babsky led Soviet research into medical radiotelemetry (endoradiosounding), directing, together with engineer A. M. Sorin, the development of miniature swallowable "radio capsules" used to measure pressure, acidity, and temperature within the human digestive tract, and, in collaboration with S. N. Davydov, their adaptation for obstetric and gynecological research.

Babsky died on 10 September 1973 in Moscow and is buried at Vvedenskoye Cemetery (plot 23).

== Selected bibliography ==
- Babsky, E. B. (1927). К вопросу о механизме рефлекторного рвотного акта [On the Mechanism of the Reflex Vomiting Act] (in Russian). Moscow: State Institute of Public Health named after Pasteur.
- Babsky, E. B.; Vereshchagin, N. K.; Zubkov, A. A.; Propper-Grashchenkov, N. I.; Timofeev, N. V. (1938). Babsky, E. B. (ed.). Курс нормальной физиологии [A Course in Normal Physiology (textbook for medical institute students)] (in Russian) (2nd (1940), 3rd (1947) ed.). Moscow, Leningrad: Medgiz.
- Babsky, E. B. (1949). И. П. Павлов. 1849–1936 [I. P. Pavlov, 1849–1936]. Outstanding Figures of Russian Medicine (in Russian) (2nd, expanded, as I. P. Pavlov: Life and Work (Uchpedgiz, 1959) ed.). Moscow: State Medical Literature Publishing House.
- Babsky, E. B. (1956). Основоположник ионной теории возбуждения Василий Юрьевич Чаговец [Vasily Yuryevich Chagovets, Founder of the Ionic Theory of Excitation]. Series 3, All-Union Society for the Dissemination of Political and Scientific Knowledge; No. 47 (in Russian). Moscow: Znanie.
- Babsky, E. B.; Ulyaninsky, L. S. (1961). Электрическая стимуляция сердца [Electrical Stimulation of the Heart] (in Russian). Moscow: Publishing House of the USSR Academy of Sciences, Institute of Biophysics.
- Babsky, E. B.; Karpman, V. L. (1963). Динамокардиография [Dynamocardiography]. Library of the Practical Physician (in Russian). Moscow: Medgiz.
- Babsky, E. B.; Parin, V. V. (1963). Главные направления и ближайшие перспективы применения современной техники в медицине [Main Directions and Near-Term Prospects for the Application of Modern Technology in Medicine (expanded text of a report to the Session of the USSR Academy of Medical Sciences)] (in Russian). Moscow.
- Babsky, E. B.; Parin, V. V. (1965). Физиология, медицина и технический прогресс [Physiology, Medicine and Technical Progress] (in Russian). Moscow: Nauka.
- Babsky, E. B.; Zubkov, A. A.; Kositsky, G. I.; Khodorov, B. I. (1972). Физиология человека [Human Physiology] (in Russian). Moscow: Meditsina.
- Babsky, E. B. (1972). Физиология человека и животных [Human and Animal Physiology] (in Russian).
- Babsky, E. B.; Sorin, A. M.; Davydov, S. N. (1975). Приборы эндорадиозондирования. Основы конструирования. Техника применения [Instruments for Endoradiosounding: Fundamentals of Design, Application Techniques] (in Russian). Moscow: Nauka.
- Babsky, Evgeni; Khodorov, Boris; Kositsky, Grigory; Zubkov, Anatoly (1989). Babsky, Evgini (ed.). Физиология человека [Human Physiology, in 2 vols.] (in Russian). Translated by Aksenova, Ludmila. Translation edited by H. C. Creighton (M.A., Oxon). Moscow: Mir Publishers. ISBN 5-03-000776-8.
- Babsky, E. B. (1977). Избранные труды [Selected Works] (in Russian). Kyiv: Naukova Dumka.
