= Gastric electrical stimulation =

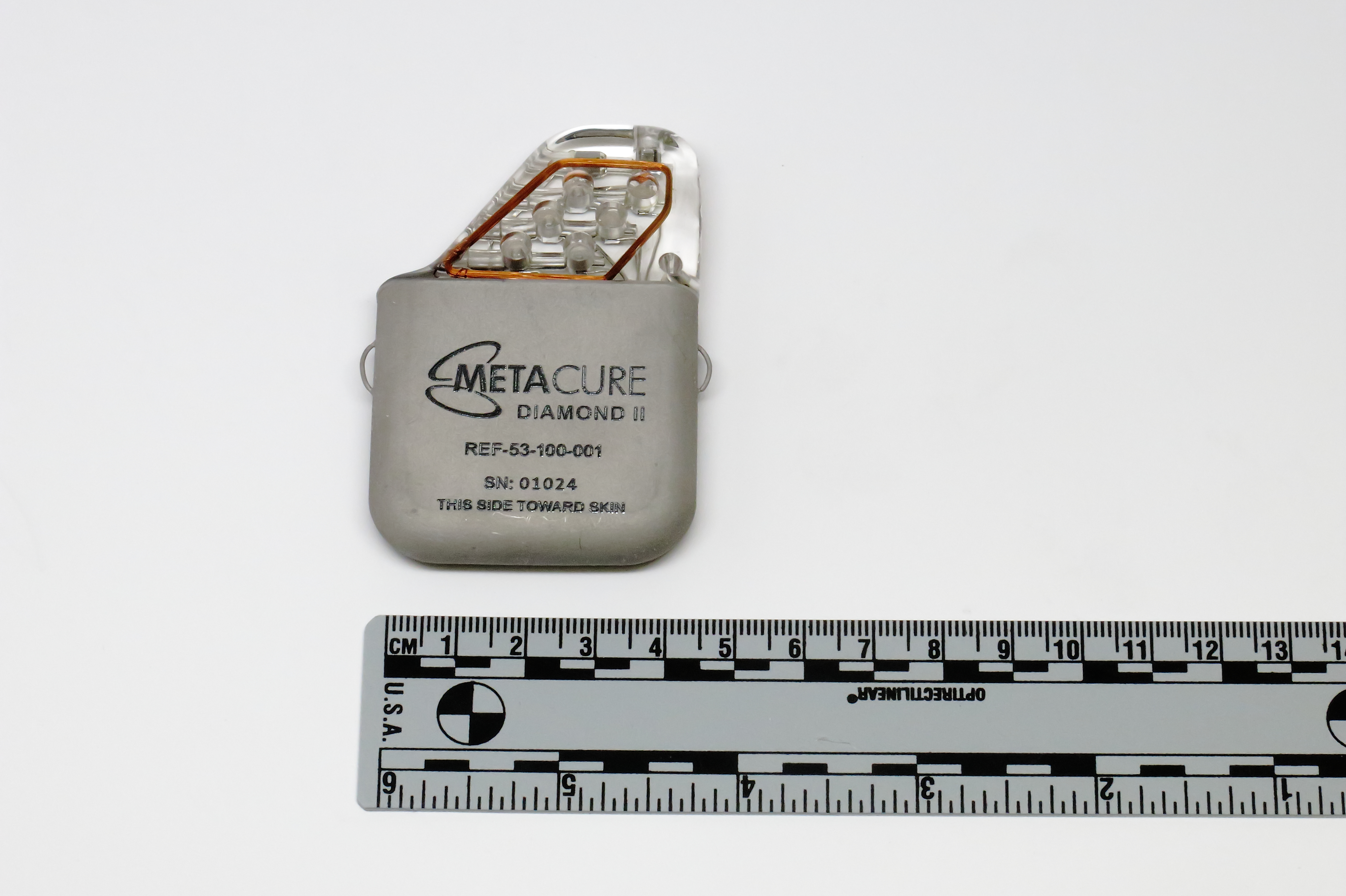
- An impulse generator

Gastric electrical stimulation, also known as implantable gastric stimulation or gastric pacing, is the use of specific devices to provide electrical stimulation to the stomach to try to bring about weight loss in those who are overweight or improve gastroparesis. It is most often used in cases of gastroparesis that do not respond to medications or diet changes.

Gastric electrical stimulation is a pacemaker-like device with electrical connections to the surface of the stomach. The device works by disrupting of the motility cycle or stimulating enteric nervous system. There are a number of different devices on the market including Transend, Maestro, and Diamond.

== Medical uses ==
These devices are for treatment of gastroparesis. The best available evidence, however, find that they are of questionable utility for this condition.

As of 2017 it is not approved for use for obesity in the United States. The first studies done did not find a benefit, however, research is ongoing. As of 2020, some small trials reported modest weight reduction, while others showed no significant changes in body weight when compared to people who did not receive the device.

In long-term studies, patients with severe nausea and vomiting have shown meaningful improvements in quality of life, symptom severity, and nutritional intake after receiving gastric pacing.

== Mechanism of action ==
Once food leaves the stomach and enters the duodenum, the gut-brain-liver axis is activated, which involves signaling between the gastrointestinal tract and the nervous system. For patients without type 2 diabetes, the gastric transit time of food is estimated to be 30–45 minutes (the time from food ingestion to food leaving the stomach into the duodenum). In type 2 diabetes, the neurohormonal communication system is impaired. Delayed signaling within the gut-brain-liver axis leads to high blood glucose concentration after meals.

Gastric pacing works by sending low-energy electrical pulses to the stomach wall. These pulses are thought to improve the coordination of stomach contractions and may influence the nerves involved in digestion. The device is surgically implanted beneath the skin, with wires (called electrodes) connected to the outer layer of the stomach (serosa). When the device is turned on, it delivers regular pulses throughout the day.

Although the precise mechanism is not completely understood, many experts believe that gastric pacing affects the vagus nerve and other parts of the nervous system that help control how the stomach feels and moves. Interestingly, GES often improves symptoms like nausea and vomiting even in patients whose stomach emptying remains slow, suggesting it may work through neural pathways rather than simply speeding digestion.

== Usage ==
There are approximately 4,000 gastric pacer surgeries a year in the United States.

== Limitations and drawbacks ==
While GES has many benefits, it also comes with risks and limitations. The procedure requires surgery, which means possible complications such as infection, bleeding, or device malfunction. Sometimes the wires shift out of place or the device stops working and must be removed or replaced.

Not all patients respond to GES. It seems to work best for people whose main symptoms are vomiting and nausea, rather than those with more bloating or pain. Diabetic patients often do better than those with idiopathic causes.

In addition, access to GES can be limited. The procedure is expensive and may not be covered by all insurance plans, especially when used for anything other than FDA-approved indications.

== Approval ==
The Diamond system first received CE mark in 2007 and is approved for sale in Europe, Australia, and Hong Kong. It is not approved in the United States for obesity.

== New technology ==
Technological improvements in gastric pacing are making the therapy easier to use and potentially more effective. In 2020, researchers tested a wireless version of the gastric stimulator. This version did not require traditional wires and was implanted using a less invasive procedure. The study found that the device worked as expected and was safe for patients to use.

Other innovations include smart stimulation systems that activate only after meals or adjust based on patient activity. Scientists are also looking at combining gastric pacing with other treatments like G-POEM (a procedure that opens the stomach's exit) to help people who need more than one kind of therapy.
