= Matan Hodorov =

Israeli economic commentator and anchorman

- מתן חודורוב
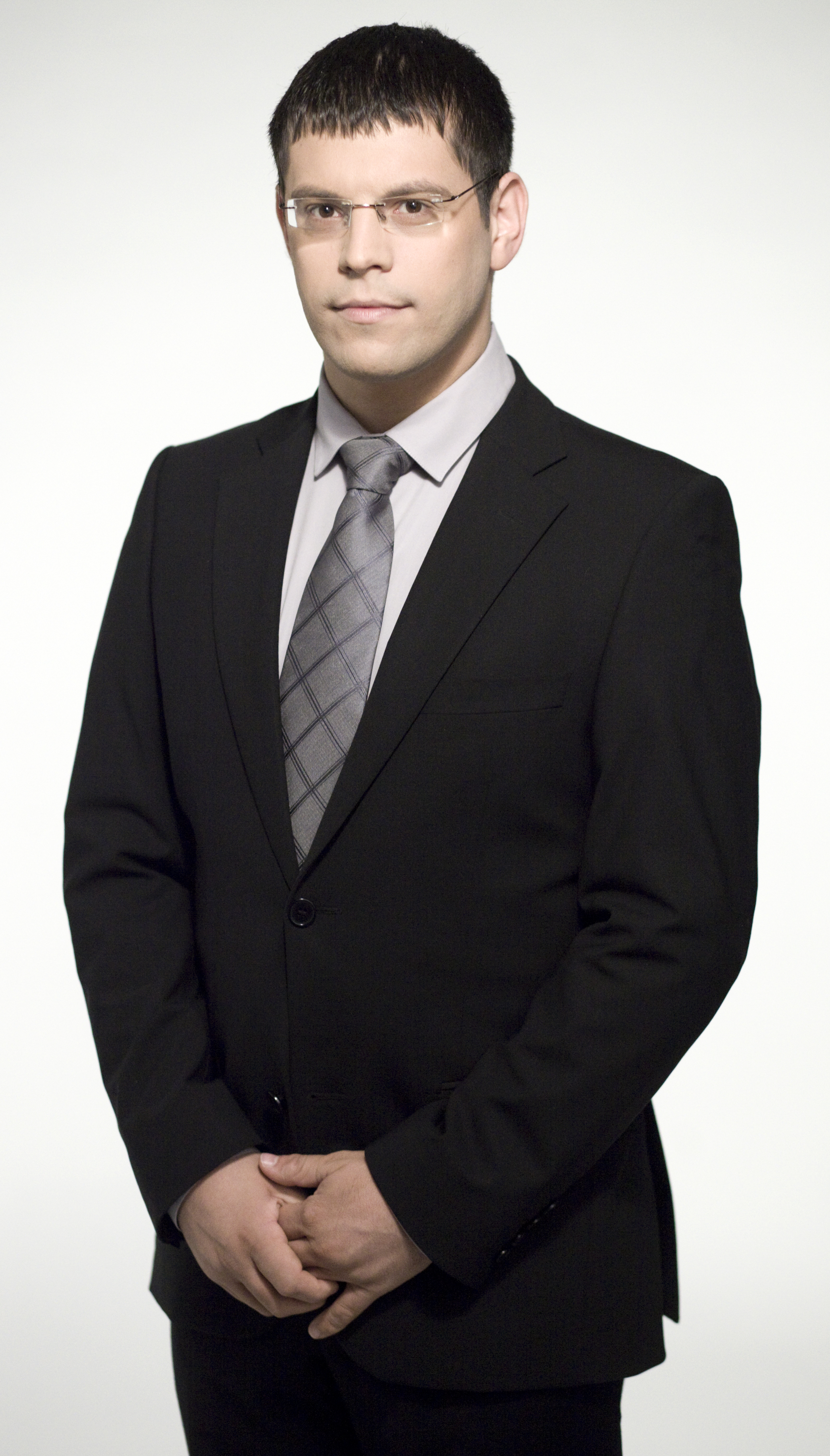
- Hodorov, January 2013
- Born: June 10, 1985 (age 41); Tel Aviv, Israel
- Education: Tel Aviv University
- Occupations: Journalist, commentator and speaker
- Website: matanhodorov.com

Matan Hodorov (Hebrew: מתן חודורוב; born June 10, 1985) is chief economic commentator and anchorman of "Analyst" Investigative Magazine at Israel's Channel 10 News.

Matan was born in 1985 in Tel Aviv. A pianist as a child, he graduated with honors from the Thelma Yellin School of the Arts.

During his army service Matan was a reporter for Galatz, the IDF radio station, where he covered stories related to finance, economic legislation, real estate and more. He continued to work for Galatz for four years after completing his service, and then made the transition to television, where he became chief economic commentator for Israel's Channel 10, the second largest TV station in the country. All of this has given him a 15-year perspective analyzing Israel's economy on a daily basis across different media platforms.

Along with news reports, Matan also created a series of documentaries focusing on the challenges of young adults in Israel. Topics covered ranged from the cost of living, real-estate market, natural gas explorations, high security budget, increasing emigration of young adults from the country, etc.

Matan is also the developer and anchor of Analyst, a 10-minute-segment that is aired twice a week as part of the central news program and deals with the cost of living of the middle class.

Matan is also an experienced lecturer, and speaks regularly in Israel and abroad before international organizations such as JFNA, Keren Hayesod, JDC, WZO, in Israel and overseas.

Matan, a graduate of Tel Aviv University law school, is based in Tel Aviv.

== Documentaries ==
Starting in 2013, Matan Hodorov has created international documentary pieces and films for Channel 10's Central News Edition. Filmed abroad, these magazine episodes enable the Israeli audience to measures results of local economic policy, with its parallels all over the world. Some of this journalistic work gave rise to a wide public discussion over the topics covered, while others were acknowledged by highly honored Jewish organizations and were awarded prizes.

Visit the official website to view some of Matan Hodorov's documentaries.

== Analyst ==
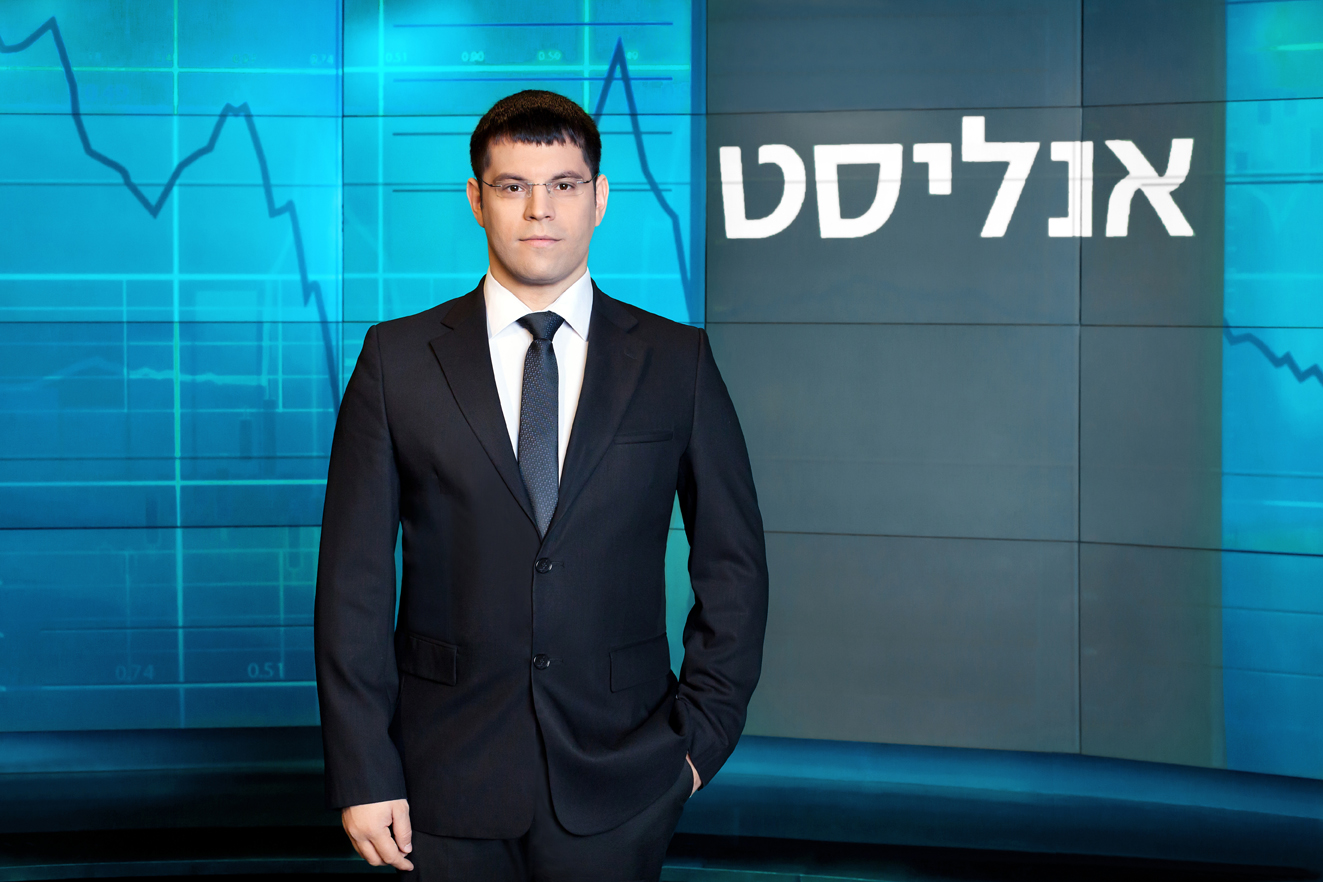
Matan Hodorov's show on Channel 10 news – Analyst

"Analyst" is an investigative segment of 8–10 minutes per episode, aired on Channel 10's Central News Edition twice a week since 2014. This magazine, presented by Matan Hodorov, typically focuses on social-economic challenges met by Israeli young adults during their daily lives: cost of living, unaffordability of housing, religious effects on the economy, widening gaps between classes, low level of some public services, outcomes of markets management under threats of wars and terror and many more.

Visit the official website of the show "Analyst", or select episodes on Matan Hodorov's official website.

== Public Speaking ==
With 15 years of experience in covering and analyzing economic decision-making in Israel, Matan Hodorov tells the story about Israel from the inside, which you haven't heard yet on International News. Matan's lectures cover a wide variety of topics, for example: Israel's Start-up Nation, Israel and the Jewish World, Economic challenges in times of war, various current affairs in Israel and more. During the past decade, Matan Hodorov has had speaking appearances in Israel and abroad – speaking for Keren Hayesod, the Jewish Federations of North America, the Joint, the World Zionist Organization, Limmud, the Israeli American Community, Jewish Organizations in Germany, Israeli Forum in Canada and more.

== Personal life ==
In 2015, Hodorov came out as gay. Hodorov is the father of a daughter and a son, whom he had in the United States, through a surrogacy procedure with his partner. He lives in Ramat Gan.

== Honors and awards ==
- 22nd B'nai B'rith Award of Excellence in Diaspora Journalism – June 2014
- Ometz (an NGO for Fighting Corruption) Award for Investigative Journalism – 2014 (auto-translated)
- One of the 100 most influential journalists in Israel according to Globes Financial Magazine – 2015 (auto-translated)
- One of the 50 most influential journalists in Israel according to Globes Financial Magazine – 2016 and 2017.
