= Autoimmune gastrointestinal dysmotility =

- Specialty: Gastroenterology

Autoimmune gastrointestinal dysmotility (AGID) is an autoimmune disease autonomic neuropathy affecting the gastrointestinal organs and digestive system of the body. Dysmotility is when the strength or coordination of the esophagus, stomach or intestines muscles do not work as they should.

== Presentation ==
=== Associated illnesses ===
Often AGID is a symptom of other problems, including colon cancer, lupus, lung, breast, or ovarian carcinoma or thymoma. or other diseases.

== Diagnosis ==
AGID is diagnosed with a complete medical history, exam of patients motility and with special blood tests looking for autoantibodies consistent with neurologic autoimmunity. Blood tests included evaluations of immunofluorescence (neuronal nuclear and cytoplasmic antibodies), radioimmunoprecipitation assays (neuronal and muscle plasma membrane cation channel antibodies), and enzyme-linked immunosorbent assay (muscle striational antibodies). A finding, along with medical history, of ganglionic neuronal acetylcholine receptor and N-type voltage-gated calcium channel autoantibodies in the blood stream would result in a medically acceptable diagnosis of AGID.

== Treatment ==
Medications to relieve nausea and vomiting or to enhance mobility may be helpful, as may cholinesterase inhibitors. Immunotherapy and plasma exchange have also been reportedly effective. Pyridostigmine is a pharmaceutical treatment option for patients with AGID. In severe cases patients with AGID are required to abandon eating foods, requiring them to get nourishment through a process called parenteral nutrition, where the patient is fed via a permanent IV and the liquid nourishment is infused directly in the blood stream, as opposed to a feeding tube.
