= Dumping syndrome =

Gastric dumping syndrome
- Other names: Gastric dumping syndrome rapid gastric emptying
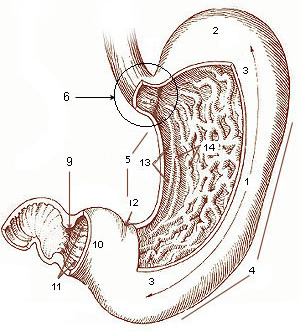
- Diagram of the stomach, showing the different regions
- Specialty: Gastroenterology, general surgery
- Complications: Dehydration, digestive diseases, electrolyte imbalance, malnutrition
- Causes: Gastrectomy, gastric bypass surgery, diabetes, esophageal surgery, absent or inefficient pyloric sphincter, pyloric stenosis

Dumping syndrome occurs when food, especially sugar, moves too quickly from the stomach to the duodenum—the first part of the small intestine—in the upper gastrointestinal (GI) tract. This condition is also called rapid gastric emptying. It is mostly associated with conditions following gastric or esophageal surgery, though it can also arise secondary to diabetes or to the use of certain medications; it is caused by an absent or insufficiently functioning pyloric sphincter, the valve between the stomach and the duodenum.

Dumping syndrome has two forms, based on when symptoms occur. Early dumping syndrome occurs 10 to 30 minutes after a meal. It results from rapid movement of fluid into the intestine following a sudden addition of a large amount of food from the stomach. The small intestine expands rapidly due to the presence of hypertonic/hyperosmolar contents from the stomach, especially sweet foods. This causes symptoms due to the shift of fluid into the intestinal lumen, with plasma volume contraction and acute intestinal distention. Osmotic diarrhea, distension of the small bowel leading to crampy abdominal pain, and reduced blood volume can result.

Late dumping syndrome occurs 2 to 3 hours after a meal. It results from excessive movement of sugar into the intestine, which raises the body's blood glucose level and causes the pancreas to increase its release of the hormone insulin. The increased release of insulin causes a rapid drop in blood glucose levels, a condition known as alimentary hypoglycemia, or low blood sugar.

== Signs and symptoms ==
The symptoms of early and late dumping syndrome are different and vary from person to person. Early dumping syndrome symptoms may include:

- nausea
- vomiting
- abdominal pain and cramping
- diarrhea
- feeling uncomfortably full or bloated after a meal
- sweating
- weakness
- dizziness
- flushing, or blushing of the face or skin
- rapid or irregular heartbeat

The symptoms of late dumping syndrome may include:

- hypoglycemia
- flushing

About 75 percent of people with dumping syndrome report symptoms of early dumping syndrome and about 25 percent report symptoms of late dumping syndrome. Some people have symptoms of both types of dumping syndrome.

== Diagnosis ==
A health care provider will diagnose dumping syndrome primarily on the basis of symptoms. The following tests may also help confirm dumping syndrome and exclude other conditions with similar symptoms:

- A modified oral glucose tolerance test checks how well insulin works with tissues to absorb glucose. A health care provider often confirms dumping syndrome in people with:
  - low blood sugar between 120 and 180 minutes after drinking the solution
  - an increase in hematocrit of more than 3 percent at 30 minutes
  - a rise in pulse rate of more than 10 beats per minute after 30 minutes
- A gastric emptying scintigraphy test involves eating a bland meal that contains a small amount of radioactive material. An external camera scans the abdomen to locate the radioactive material. The radiologist measures the rate of gastric emptying at 1, 2, 3, and 4 hours after the meal. The test can help confirm a diagnosis of dumping syndrome.

The health care provider may also examine the structure of the esophagus, stomach, and upper small intestine with the following tests:

- An upper GI endoscopy to see the upper GI tract. A gastroenterologist carefully feeds the endoscope down the esophagus and into the stomach and duodenum. A small camera mounted on the endoscope transmits a video image to a monitor, allowing close examination of the intestinal lining.
- An upper GI series examines the small intestine. During the procedure, the person will stand or sit in front of an x-ray machine and drink barium, a chalky liquid. Barium coats the small intestine, making signs of a blockage or other complications of gastric surgery show up more clearly on x rays.

== Treatment ==
Treatment for dumping syndrome includes changes in eating, diet, and nutrition; medication; and, in some cases, surgery. Many people with dumping syndrome have mild symptoms that improve over time with simple dietary changes.

=== Lifestyle changes ===
The first step to minimizing symptoms of dumping syndrome involves changes in eating, diet, and nutrition, and may include:

- eating five or six small meals a day instead of three larger meals
- delaying liquid intake until at least 30 minutes after a meal
- increasing intake of protein, fiber, and complex carbohydrates—found in starchy foods such as oatmeal and rice
- avoiding simple sugars such as table sugar, which can be found in candy, syrup, sodas, and juice beverages
- increasing the thickness of food by adding pectin or guar gum—plant extracts used as thickening agents

Some people find that lying down for 30 minutes after meals also helps reduce symptoms, though evidence regarding the benefits of doing so is lacking.

=== Medication ===
A health care provider may prescribe octreotide acetate injections to treat dumping syndrome symptoms. The medication works by slowing gastric emptying and inhibiting the release of insulin and other GI hormones.

=== Surgery ===
A person may need surgery if dumping syndrome is caused by previous gastric surgery or if the condition is not responsive to other treatments. For most people, the type of surgery depends on the type of gastric surgery performed previously. However, surgery to correct dumping syndrome often has unsuccessful results.
