= Gastric emptying study =

Nuclear medicine study of the stomach's ability to empty

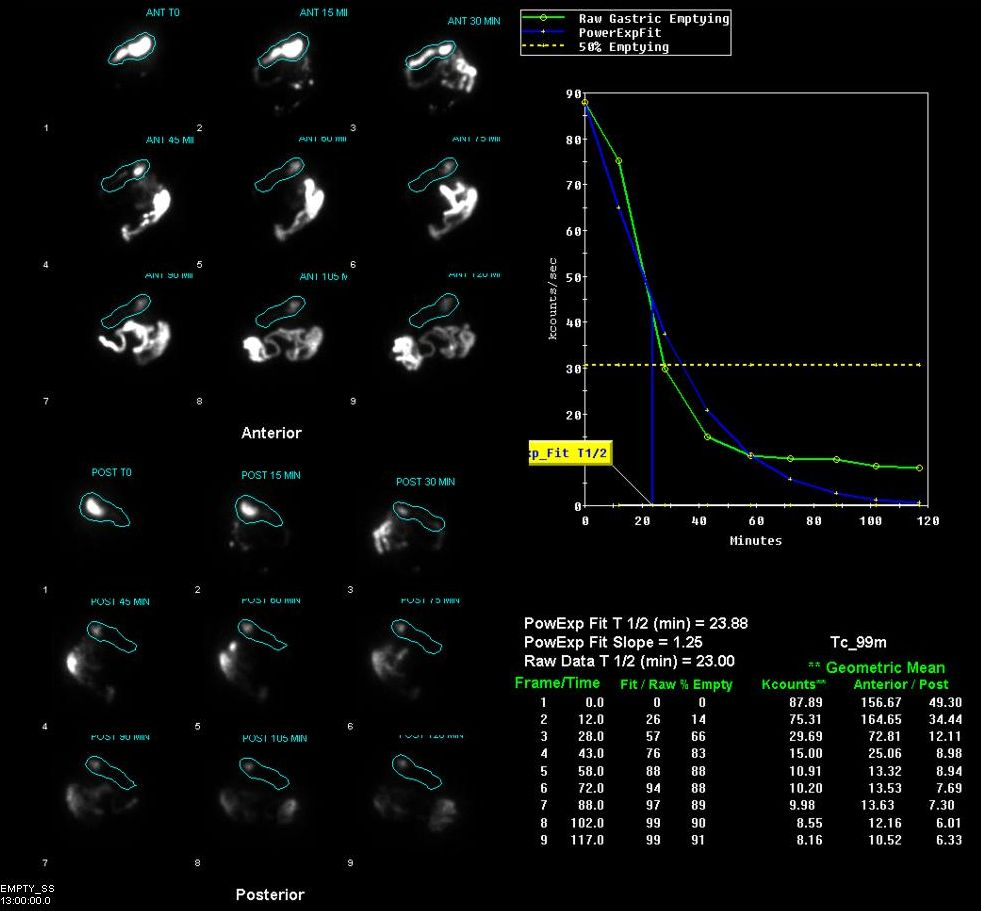
- Example gastric emptying images
- Synonyms: Gastric emptying sccan, gastric emptying scintigraphy
- ICD-10-PCS: CD171ZZ
- OPS-301 code: 3-707
- LOINC: 39768-7

A gastric emptying study is a nuclear medicine study which provides an assessment of the stomach's ability to empty. It may be used if there are complications after gastric surgery, for gastric reflux, or suspected gastroparesis amongst other indications. Scintigraphy that uses gamma cameras to create two-dimensional images is generally regarded as the gold standard for gastric emptying.

== Procedure ==
Having fasted for around four hours before the study, the patient is given a solid or semi-solid meal, such as scrambled eggs on toast or porridge, which has been prepared with a radiopharmaceutical component. Typically technetium-99m sulphur colloid or DTPA is used. Some studies may also involve a liquid component, which is labelled with indium-111 DTPA. Images are acquired with a gamma camera, initially dynamically and then at intervals for up to 2-3 hours.

== Analysis ==
The stomach time-activity curve is produced from geometric mean of anterior and posterior imaging. Half-emptying time, the lag-phase duration for solid studies, and percentage of food left at various time points are calculated.
