= Mir Publishers =

Soviet Russian publisher

- Status: Active
- Founded: May 4, 1946
- Founder: USSR Council of Ministers
- Headquarters location: Moscow, Russia
- Official website: mir-publishers.ru at the Wayback Machine (archived 2010-12-24)

Mir Publishers (Russian: Издательство "Мир") was a major publishing house in the Soviet Union which continues to exist in modern Russia. It was established in 1946 by a decree of the USSR Council of Ministers and has been headquartered in Moscow since then. It was completely state funded, which was the reason for the low prices of the books it published.

Its scope was domestic and translated special and tutorial literature in various domains of science and engineering: mathematics, physics, chemistry, biology, agriculture, transport, energy, etc. Many Soviet scientists and engineers were its contributors. The staff provided translation from original Russian. In addition, during the Soviet times it was known for translated foreign scientific and popular science books as well as science fiction. Many of Mir's books were and are used as textbooks for studies of science in many countries.

The publishing house survived after the dissolution of the Soviet Union and was eventually privatised and later expanded its scope by incorporating a number of state publishing houses: Kolos (Колос), Transport (Транспорт), Khimiya (Химия), Metallurgiya (Металлургия), Legprombitizdat (Легпромбытиздат), and Energoatomizdat (Энергоатомиздат).

In 2008, the company faced a bankruptcy case. The case was closed by the Moscow Arbitral Court on June 2, 2009 because the publishing house had paid completely the debt to the creditors.

Note: its old domain, mir-publishers.net, is squatted.

== Book series ==
=== English language ===
- Advances in Science and Technology in the USSR: Biology Series
- Advances in Science and Technology in the USSR: Chemistry Series
- Advances in Science and Technology in the USSR: Mathematics and Mechanics Series
- Advances in Science and Technology in the USSR: Physics Series
- Advances in Science and Technology in the USSR: Technology Series
- Higher Mathematics Series
- Little Mathematics Library
- Science for Everyone

=== French language ===
- Science soviétique

=== Spanish language ===
- Ciencia Popular
- Los Científicos a los Escolares (CE)
- Física al Alcance de Todos
- Lecciones Populares de Matemáticas
