= ICD-9-CM Volume 3 =

System of procedure codes within ICD-9 Clinical Modification

ICD-9-CM Volume 3 is a system of procedural codes used by health insurers to classify medical procedures for billing purposes. It is a subset of the International Statistical Classification of Diseases and Related Health Problems (ICD) 9-CM. Volumes 1 and 2 are used for diagnostic codes.

== (00) Procedures and interventions, not elsewhere classified ==
- (00) Procedures and interventions, not elsewhere classified
  - (00.0) Therapeutic ultrasound
    - (00.01) Therapeutic ultrasound of vessels of head and neck
      - Anti-restenotic ultrasound
      - Intravascular non-ablative ultrasound
    - (00.02) Therapeutic ultrasound of heart
      - Anti-restenotic ultrasound
      - Intravascular non-ablative ultrasound
    - (00.03) Therapeutic ultrasound of peripheral vascular vessels
      - Anti-restenotic ultrasound
      - Intravascular non-ablative ultrasound
    - (00.09) Other therapeutic ultrasound
  - (00.1) Pharamaceuticals
    - (00.10) Implantation of chemotherapeutic agent
      - Brain wafer chemotherapy
      - Interstitial/ intracavitary
    - (00.11) Infusion of drotrecogin alfa (activated)
      - Infusion of recombinant protein
    - (00.12) Administration of inhaled nitric oxide
      - Nitric oxide therapy
    - (00.13) Injection or infusion of nesiritide
      - Human B-type natriuretic peptide (hBNP)
    - (00.14) Injection or infusion of oxazolidinone class of antibiotics
      - Linezolid injection
    - (00.15) High-dose infusion interleukin-2 [IL-2]
      - Infusion (IV bolus, CIV) interleukin
      - Injection of aldesleukin
    - (00.16) Pressurized treatment of venous bypass graft [conduit] with pharmaceutical substance
      - Ex-vivo treatment of vessel
      - Hyperbaric pressurized graft [conduit]
    - (00.17) Infusion of vasopressor agent
    - (00.18) Infusion of immunosuppressive antibody therapy
      - Includes: during induction phase of solid organ transplantation
      - monoclonal antibody therapy
      - polyclonal antibody therapy
    - (00.19) Disruption of blood brain barrier via infusion [BBBD]
      - Infusion of substance to disrupt blood brain barrier
  - (00.2) Intravascular imaging of blood vessels
    - Endovascular ultrasonography
    - Intravascular ultrasound (IVUS)
    - Intravascular [ultrasound] imaging of blood vessels
    - (00.21) Intravascular imaging of extracranial cerebral vessels
      - Common carotid vessels and branches
      - Intravascular ultrasound (IVUS), extracranial cerebral vessels
    - (00.22) Intravascular imaging of intrathoracic vessels
      - Aorta and aortic arch
      - Intravascular ultrasound (IVUS), intrathoracic vessels
      - Vena cava (superior) (inferior)
    - (00.23) Intravascular imaging of peripheral vessels
      - Imaging of vessels of arm(s)
      - Imaging of vessels of leg(s)
      - Intravascular ultrasound (IVUS), peripheral vessels
    - (00.24) Intravascular imaging of coronary vessels
      - Intravascular ultrasound (IVUS), coronary vessels
    - (00.25) Intravascular imaging of renal vessels
      - Intravascular ultrasound (IVUS), renal vessels
      - Renal artery
    - (00.28) Intravascular imaging, other specified vessel(s)
    - (00.29) Intravascular imaging, unspecified vessel(s)
  - (00.3) Computer assisted surgery [CAS]
    - CT-free navigation
    - Image guided navigation (IGN)
    - Image guided surgery (IGS)
    - Imageless navigation
    - That without the use of robotic(s) technology
    - (00.31) Computer assisted surgery with CT/CTA
    - (00.32) Computer assisted surgery with MR/MRA
    - (00.33) Computer assisted surgery with fluoroscopy
    - (00.34) Imageless computer assisted surgery
    - (00.35) Computer assisted surgery with multiple datasets
    - (00.39) Other computer assisted surgery
      - Computer assisted surgery NOS
  - (00.4) Adjunct Vascular System Procedures
    - (00.40) Procedure on single vessel
      - Number of vessels, unspecified
    - (00.41) Procedure on two vessels
    - (00.42) Procedure on three vessels
    - (00.43) Procedure on four or more vessels
    - (00.44) Procedure on vessel bifurcation
    - (00.45) Insertion of one vascular stent
      - Number of stents, unspecified
    - (00.46) Insertion of two vascular stents
    - (00.47) Insertion of three vascular stents
    - (00.48) Insertion of four or more vascular stents
    - (00.49) SuperSaturated oxygen therapy
      - Aqueous oxygen (AO) therapy
      - SS02
      - SuperOxygenation infusion therapy
  - (00.5) Other cardiovascular procedures
    - (00.50) Implantation of cardiac resynchronization pacemaker without mention of defibrillation, total system [CRT-P]
      - Biventricular pacemaker
      - Biventricular pacing without internal cardiac defibrillator
      - Implantation of cardiac resynchronization (biventricular) pulse generator pacing device, formation of pocket, transvenous leads including placement of lead into left ventricular coronary venous system, and intraoperative procedures for evaluation of lead signals.
      - That with CRT-P generator and one or more leads
    - (00.51) Implantation of cardiac resynchronization defibrillator, total system [CRT-D]
      - Biventricular defibrillator
      - Biventricular pacing with internal cardiac defibrillator
      - BiV ICD
      - BiV pacemaker with defibrillator
      - BiV pacing with defibrillator
      - Implantation of a cardiac resynchronization (biventricular) pulse generator with defibrillator [AICD], formation of pocket, transvenous leads, including placement of lead into left ventricular coronary venous system, intraoperative procedures for evaluation of lead signals, and obtaining defibrillator threshold measurements.
      - That with CRT-D generator and one or more leads
    - (00.52) Implantation or replacement of transvenous lead [electrode] into left ventricular coronary venous system
    - (00.53) Implantation or replacement of cardiac resynchronization pacemaker pulse generator only [CRT-P]
      - Implantation of CRT-P device with removal of any existing CRT-P or other pacemaker device
    - (00.54) Implantation or replacement of cardiac resynchronization defibrillator pulse generator device only [CRT-D]
      - Implantation of CRT-D device with removal of any existing CRT-D, CRT-P, pacemaker, or defibrillator device
    - (00.55) Insertion of drug-eluting peripheral vessel stent(s)
      - Endograft(s)
      - Endovascular graft(s)
      - Stent grafts
    - (00.56) Insertion or replacement of implantable pressure sensor (lead) for intracardiac hemodynamic monitoring
    - (00.58) Insertion of intra-aneurysm sac pressure monitoring device (intraoperative)
      - Insertion of pressure sensor during endovascular repair of abdominal or thoracic aortic aneurysm(s)
    - (00.59) Intravascular pressure measurement of coronary arteries
      - Includes: fractional flow reserve (FFR)
  - (00.6) Procedures on blood vessels
    - (00.61) Percutaneous angioplasty or atherectomy of precerebral (extracranial) vessel(s)
      - Basilar
      - Carotid
      - Vertebral
    - (00.62) Percutaneous angioplasty or atherectomy of intracranial vessel(s)
    - (00.63) Percutaneous insertion of carotid artery stent(s)
      - Non-drug-eluting stent
    - (00.64) Percutaneous insertion of other precerebral (extracranial) artery stent(s)
      - Basilar stent
      - Vertebral stent
    - (00.65) Percutaneous insertion of intracranial vascular stent(s)
    - (00.66) Percutaneous transluminal coronary angioplasty [PTCA] or coronary atherectomy
      - Balloon angioplasty of coronary artery
    - (00.67) Intravascular pressure measurement of intrathoracic arteries
    - (00.68) Intravascular pressure measurement of peripheral arteries
  - (00.7) Other hip procedures
    - (00.70) Revision of hip replacement, both acetabular and femoral components
    - (00.71) Revision of hip replacement, acetabular component
    - (00.72) Revision of hip replacement, femoral component
    - (00.73) Revision of hip replacement, acetabular liner and/or femoral head only
    - (00.74) Hip bearing surface, metal-on-polyethylene
    - (00.75) Hip bearing surface, metal-on-metal
    - (00.76) Hip bearing surface, ceramic-on-ceramic
    - (00.77) Hip bearing surface, ceramic-on-polyethylene
  - (00.8) Other knee and hip procedures
    - (00.80) Revision of knee replacement, total (all components)
    - (00.81) Revision of knee replacement, tibial component
    - (00.82) Revision of knee replacement, femoral component
    - (00.83) Revision of knee replacement, patellar component
    - (00.84) Revision of total knee replacement, tibial insert (liner)
  - (00.9) Other procedures and interventions
    - (00.91) Transplant from live related donor
    - (00.92) Transplant from live non-related donor
    - (00.93) Transplant from cadaver
    - (00.94) Intra-operative neurophysiologic monitoring

== (01–05) Operations on the nervous system ==
- (01) Incision and excision of skull, brain, and cerebral meninges
  - (01.0) Cranial puncture
    - (01.01) Cisternal puncture
    - (01.02) Ventriculopuncture through previously implanted catheter
    - (01.09) Other cranial puncture
  - (01.1) Diagnostic procedures on skull, brain, and cerebral meninges
    - (01.10) Intracranial pressure monitoring
    - (01.11) Closed [percutaneous] [needle] biopsy of cerebral meninges
      - Burr hole approach
    - (01.12) Open biopsy of cerebral meninges
    - (01.13) Closed [percutaneous] [needle] biopsy of brain
    - (01.14) Open biopsy of brain
    - (01.15) Biopsy of skull
    - (01.16) Intracranial oxygen monitoring
    - (01.17) Brain temperature monitoring
    - (01.18) Other diagnostic procedures on brain and cerebral meninges
    - (01.19) Other diagnostic procedures on skull
  - (01.2) Craniotomy and craniectomy
    - (01.21) Incision and drainage of cranial sinus
    - (01.22) Removal of intracranial neurostimulator lead(s)
    - (01.23) Reopening of craniotomy site
    - (01.24) Other craniotomy
    - (01.25) Other craniectomy
      - Sequestrectomy of skull
    - (01.26) Insertion of catheter(s) into cranial cavity or tissue
    - (01.27) Removal of catheter(s) from cranial cavity or tissue
    - (01.28) Placement of intracerebral catheter(s) via burr hole(s)
  - (01.3) Incision of brain and cerebral meninges
    - (01.31) Incision of cerebral meninges
      - Drainage of: intracranial hygroma, subarachnoid abscess (cerebral), subdural empyema
    - (01.32) Lobotomy and tractotomy
      - Percutaneous (radiofrequency) cingulotomy
    - (01.39) Other incision of brain
      - Amygdalohippocampotomy
      - Drainage of intracerebral hematoma
  - (01.4) Operations on thalamus and globus pallidus
    - (01.41) Operations on thalamus
      - Chemothalamectomy
      - Thalamotomy
    - (01.42) Operations on globus pallidus
      - Pallidoansectomy
      - Pallidotomy
  - (01.5) Other excision or destruction of brain and meninges
    - (01.51) Excision of lesion or tissue of cerebral meninges
    - (01.52) Hemispherectomy
    - (01.53) Lobectomy of brain
    - (01.59) Other excision or destruction of lesion or tissue of brain
      - Curettage of brain
      - Debridement of brain
      - Marsupialization of brain cyst
      - Transtemporal (mastoid) excision of brain tumor
  - (01.6) Excision of lesion of skull
    - Removal of granulation tissue of cranium
- (02) Other operations on skull, brain, and cerebral meninges
  - (02.0) Cranioplasty
  - (02.1) Repair of cerebral meninges
  - (02.2) Ventriculostomy
  - (02.3) Extracranial ventricular shunt
  - (02.4) Revision, removal, and irrigation of ventricular shunt
  - (02.9) Other operations on skull, brain, and cerebral meninges
- (03) Operations on spinal cord and spinal canal structures
  - (03.0) Exploration and decompression of spinal canal structures
    - (03.01) Removal of foreign body from spinal canal
    - (03.02) Reopening of laminectomy site
    - (03.09) Other exploration and decompression of spinal canal
      - Laminectomy
      - Laminotomy
      - Laminoplasty
      - Foraminotomy
  - (03.1) Division of intraspinal nerve root
    - Rhizotomy
  - (03.2) Chordotomy
    - (03.21) Percutaneous chordotomy
      - Stereotactic chordotomy
    - (03.29) Other chordotomy
      - Tractotomy
  - (03.3) Diagnostic procedures on spinal cord and spinal canal structures
    - (03.31) Spinal tap
      - Lumbar puncture for removal of dye
    - (03.32) Biopsy of spinal cord or spinal meninges
    - (03.39) Other diagnostic procedures on spinal cord and spinal canal structures
  - (03.4) Excision or destruction of lesion of spinal cord or spinal meninges
  - (03.5) Plastic operations on spinal cord structures
    - (03.51) Repair of spinal meningocele
    - (03.52) Repair of spinal myelomeningocele
    - (03.53) Repair of vertebral fracture
    - (03.59) Other repair and plastic operations on spinal cord structures
      - Diastematomyelia
  - (03.6) Lysis of adhesions of spinal cord and nerve roots
  - (03.7) Shunt of spinal theca
    - (03.71) Spinal subarachnoid-peritoneal shunt
    - (03.72) Spinal subarachnoid-ureteral shunt
    - (03.79) Other shunt of spinal theca
      - Pleurothecal anastomosis
      - Salpingothecal anastomosis
  - (03.8) Injection of destructive agent into spinal canal
  - (03.9) Other operations on spinal cord and spinal canal structures
    - (03.90) Insertion of catheter into spinal canal for infusion of therapeutic or palliative substances
    - (03.91) Injection of anesthetic into spinal canal for analgesia
    - (03.92) Injection of other agent into spinal canal
      - Intrathecal injection of steroid
      - Subarachnoid perfusion of refrigerated saline
    - (03.93) Implantation or replacement of spinal neurostimulator lead(s)
    - (03.94) Removal of spinal neurostimulator lead(s)
    - (03.95) Spinal blood patch
    - (03.96) Percutaneous denervation of facet
    - (03.97) Revision of spinal thecal shunt
    - (03.98) Removal of spinal thecal shunt
    - (03.99) Other
- (04) Operations on cranial and other nerves
  - (04.0) Incision, division, and excision of cranial and other nerves
    - (04.05) Gasserian ganglionectomy
    - (04.06) Other cranial or peripheral ganglionectomy
  - (04.8) Injection into a nerve
    - (04.81) Injection of anesthetic into a nerve for analgesia
- (05) Operations on sympathetic nerves or ganglia
  - (05.2) Sympathectomy
    - (05.21) Sphenopalatine ganglionectomy
    - (05.29) Other sympathectomy and ganglionectomy

== (06–07) Operations on the endocrine system ==
- (06) Operations on thyroid and parathyroid glands
  - (06.0) Incision of thyroid field
  - (06.1) Diagnostic procedures on thyroid and parathyroid glands
  - (06.2) Unilateral thyroid lobectomy
  - (06.3) Other partial thyroidectomy
  - (06.4) Complete thyroidectomy
  - (06.5) Substernal thyroidectomy
  - (06.6) Excision of lingual thyroid
  - (06.7) Excision of thyroglossal duct or tract
  - (06.8) Parathyroidectomy
  - (06.9) Other operations on thyroid (region) and parathyroid
- (07) Operations on other endocrine glands
  - (07.0) Exploration of adrenal field
  - (07.1) Diagnostic procedures on adrenal glands, pituitary gland, pineal gland, and thymus
  - (07.2) Partial adrenalectomy
  - (07.3) Bilateral adrenalectomy
  - (07.4) Other operations on adrenal glands, nerves, and vessels
  - (07.5) Operations on pineal gland
  - (07.6) Hypophysectomy
  - (07.7) Other operations on hypophysis
  - (07.8) Thymectomy
  - (07.9) Other operations on thymus

== (08–16) Operations on the eye ==
- (08) Operations on eyelids
- (09) Operations on lacrimal system
- (10) Operations on conjunctiva
- (11) Operations on cornea
  - (11.6) Corneal transplant
  - (11.7) Other reconstructive and refractive surgery on cornea
    - Keratomileusis
    - (11.75) Radial keratotomy
- (12) Operations on iris, ciliary body, sclera, and anterior chamber
- (13) Operations on lens
  - Cataract surgery
  - (13.41) Phacoemulsification and aspiration of cataract
- (14) Operations on retina, choroid, vitreous, and posterior chamber
  - (14.0) Removal of foreign body from posterior segment of eye
  - (14.1) Diagnostic procedures on retina, choroid, vitreous, and posterior chamber
  - (14.2) Destruction of lesion of retina and choroid
  - (14.3) Repair of retinal tear
  - (14.4) Repair of retinal detachment with scleral buckling and implant
  - (14.5) Other repair of retinal detachment
  - (14.6) Removal of surgically implanted material from posterior segment of eye
  - (14.7) Operations on vitreous
  - (14.9) Other operations on retina, choroid, and posterior chamber
- (15) Operations on extraocular muscles
- (16) Operations on orbit and eyeball
  - (16.4) Enucleation of the Eye

== (18–20) Operations on the ear ==
- (18) Operations on external ear
  - (18.0) Incision of external ear
  - (18.1) Diagnostic procedures on external ear
  - (18.2) Excision or destruction of lesion of external ear
  - (18.3) Other excision of external ear
  - (18.4) Suture of laceration of external ear
  - (18.5) Surgical correction of prominent ear
  - (18.6) Reconstruction of external auditory canal
  - (18.7) Other plastic repair of external ear
    - (18.71) Construction of auricle of ear
    - (18.72) Reattachment of amputated ear
    - (18.79) Other plastic repair of external ear
      - Otoplasty NOS
  - (18.9) Other operations on external ear
- (19) Reconstructive operations on middle ear
  - (19.0) Stapes mobilization
  - (19.1) Stapedectomy
  - (19.2) Revision of stapedectomy
  - (19.3) Other operations on ossicular chain
  - (19.4) Myringoplasty
  - (19.5) Other tympanoplasty
  - (19.6) Revision of tympanoplasty
  - (19.9) Other repair of middle ear
- (20) Other operations on middle and inner ear
  - (20.0) Myringotomy
  - (20.1) Removal of tympanostomy tube
  - (20.2) Incision of mastoid and middle ear
  - (20.3) Diagnostic procedures on middle and inner ear
  - (20.4) Mastoidectomy
  - (20.5) Other excision of middle ear
  - (20.6) Fenestration of inner ear
  - (20.7) Incision, excision, and destruction of inner ear
  - (20.8) Operations on Eustachian tube
  - (20.9) Other operations on inner and middle ear

== (21-29) Operations on the nose, mouth and pharynx ==
- (21) Operations on nose
  - (21.0) Control of epistaxis
  - (21.1) Incision of nose
  - (21.2) Diagnostic procedures on nose
  - (21.3) Local excision or destruction of lesion of nose
  - (21.4) Resection of nose
  - (21.5) Submucous Resection (SMR) of nasal septum
  - (21.6) Turbinectomy
  - (21.7) Reduction of nasal fracture
  - (21.8) Repair and plastic operations on the nose
    - (21.81) Suture of laceration of nose
    - (21.82) Closure of nasal fistula
    - (21.83) Total nasal reconstruction
    - (21.84) Revision rhinoplasty
    - (21.85) Augmentation rhinoplasty
    - (21.86) Limited rhinoplasty
    - (21.87) Other rhinoplasty
    - (21.88) Other septoplasty
    - (21.89) Other repair and plastic operations on nose
  - (21.9) Other operations on nose
- (22) Operations on nasal sinuses
- (23) Removal and restoration of teeth
  - (23.0) Forceps extraction of tooth
  - (23.1) Surgical removal of tooth
  - (23.2) Restoration of tooth by filling
  - (23.3) Restoration of tooth by inlay
  - (23.4) Other dental restoration
  - (23.5) Implantation of tooth
  - (23.6) Prosthetic dental implant
  - (23.7) Apicoectomy and root canal therapy
- (24) Other operations on teeth, gums, and alveoli
  - (24.0) Incision of gum or alveolar bone
  - (24.1) Diagnostic procedures on teeth, gums, and alveoli
  - (24.2) Gingivoplasty
  - (24.3) Other operations on gum
  - (24.4) Excision of dental lesion of jaw
  - (24.5) Alveoloplasty
  - (24.6) Exposure of tooth
  - (24.7) Application of orthodontic appliance
  - (24.8) Other orthodontic operation
  - (24.9) Other dental operations
- (25) Operations on tongue
  - (25.0) Diagnostic procedures on tongue
  - (25.1) Excision or destruction of lesion or tissue of tongue
  - (25.2) Partial glossectomy
  - (25.3) Complete glossectomy
  - (25.4) Radical glossectomy
  - (25.5) Repair of tongue and glossoplasty
  - (25.9) Other operations on tongue
    - (25.91) Lingual frenotomy
    - (25.92) Lingual frenectomy
    - (25.93) Lysis of adhesions of tongue
    - (25.94) Other glossotomy
    - (25.99) Other
- (26) Operations on salivary glands and ducts
- (27) Other operations on mouth and face
  - (27.0) Drainage of face and floor of mouth
  - (27.1) Incision of palate
  - (27.2) Diagnostic procedures on oral cavity
  - (27.3) Excision of lesion or tissue of bony palate
  - (27.4) Excision of other parts of mouth
    - (27.41) Labial frenectomy
    - (27.42) Wide excision of lesion of lip
    - (27.43) Other excision of lesion or tissue of lip
    - (27.49) Other excision of mouth
  - (27.5) Plastic repair of mouth
  - (27.6) Palatoplasty
  - (27.7) Operations on uvula
  - (27.9) Other operations on mouth and face
- (28) Operations on tonsils and adenoids
  - (28.2) Tonsillectomy without adenoidectomy
  - (28.3) Tonsillectomy with adenoidectomy
  - (28.6) Adenoidectomy without tonsillectomy
- (29) Operations on pharynx

== (30–34) Operations on the respiratory system ==
- (30) Excision of larynx
  - (30.0) Excision or destruction of lesion or tissue of larynx
  - (30.1) Hemilaryngectomy
  - (30.2) Other partial laryngectomy
  - (30.3) Complete laryngectomy
  - (30.4) Radical laryngectomy
- (31) Other operations on larynx and trachea
  - (31.0) Injection of larynx
  - (31.1) Temporary tracheostomy
  - (31.2) Permanent tracheostomy
  - (31.3) Other incision of larynx or trachea
  - (31.4) Diagnostic procedures on larynx and trachea
  - (31.5) Local excision or destruction of lesion or tissue of trachea
  - (31.6) Repair of larynx
  - (31.7) Repair and plastic operations on trachea
  - (31.9) Other operations on larynx and trachea
- (32) Excision of lung and bronchus
  - (32.0) Local excision or destruction of lesion or tissue of bronchus
  - (32.1) Other excision of bronchus
  - (32.2) Local excision or destruction of lesion or tissue of lung
  - (32.3) Segmental resection of lung
  - (32.4) Lobectomy of lung
  - (32.5) Complete pneumonectomy
  - (32.6) Radical dissection of thoracic structures
  - (32.9) Other excision of lung
- (33) Other operations on lung and bronchus
  - (33.0) Incision of bronchus
  - (33.1) Incision of lung
  - (33.2) Diagnostic procedures on lung and bronchus
    - (33.21) Bronchoscopy through artificial stoma
    - (33.22) Fiber-optic bronchoscopy
    - (33.23) Other bronchoscopy
    - (33.24) Closed (endoscopic) biopsy of bronchus
    - (33.25) Open biopsy of bronchus
    - (33.26) Closed (percutaneous) (needle) biopsy of lung
    - (33.27) Closed endoscopic biopsy of lung
    - (33.28) Open biopsy of lung
    - (33.29) Other diagnostic procedures on lung and bronchus
  - (33.3) Surgical collapse of lung
  - (33.4) Repair and plastic operation on lung and bronchus
  - (33.5) Lung transplant
  - (33.6) Combined heart-lung transplantation
  - (33.9) Other operations on lung and bronchus
- (34) Operations on chest wall, pleura, mediastinum, and diaphragm
  - (34.0) Incision of chest wall and pleura
    - (34.02) Exploratory thoracotomy
  - (34.1) Incision of mediastinum
  - (34.2) Diagnostic procedures on chest wall, pleura, mediastinum, and diaphragm
    - (34.21) Transpleural thoracoscopy
    - (34.22) Mediastinoscopy
    - (34.23) Biopsy of chest wall
    - (34.24) Pleural biopsy
    - (34.25) Closed (percutaneous) (needle) biopsy of mediastinum
    - (34.26) Open mediastinal biopsy
    - (34.27) Biopsy of diaphragm
    - (34.28) Other diagnostic procedures on chest wall, pleura, and diaphragm
    - (34.29) Other diagnostic procedures on mediastinum
  - (34.3) Excision or destruction of lesion or tissue of mediastinum
  - (34.4) Excision or destruction of lesion of chest wall
  - (34.5) Pleurectomy
  - (34.6) Scarification of pleura
  - (34.7) Repair of chest wall
    - (34.74) Repair of pectus deformity
  - (34.8) Operations on diaphragm
  - (34.9) Other operations on thorax
    - (34.91) Thoracentesis
    - (34.92) Injection into thoracic cavity
      - Chemical pleurodesis

== (35–39) Operations on the cardiovascular system ==
=== Heart ===
- (35) Operations on valves and septa of heart
  - (35.0) Closed heart valvotomy
  - (35.1) Open heart valvuloplasty without replacement
  - (35.2) Replacement of heart valve
  - (35.3) Operations on structures adjacent to heart valves
  - (35.4) Production of septal defect in heart
  - (35.5) Repair of atrial and ventricular septa with prosthesis
  - (35.6) Repair of atrial and ventricular septa with tissue graft
  - (35.7) Other and unspecified repair of atrial and ventricular septa
  - (35.8) Total repair of certain congenital cardiac anomalies
  - (35.9) Other operations on valves and septa of heart
    - (35.94) Creation of conduit between atrium and pulmonary artery
      - Fontan procedure
- (36) Operations on vessels of heart
  - (36.0) Removal of coronary artery obstruction and insertion of stent(s)
  - (36.1) Bypass anastomosis for heart revascularization
  - (36.2) Heart revascularization by arterial implant
  - (36.3) Other heart revascularization
  - (36.9) Other operations on vessels of heart
- (37) Other operations on heart and pericardium
  - (37.0) Pericardiocentesis
  - (37.1) Cardiotomy and pericardiotomy
  - (37.2) Diagnostic procedures on heart and pericardium
  - (37.3) Pericardiectomy and excision of lesion of heart
    - (37.31) Pericardiectomy
    - (37.32) Excision of aneurysm of heart
    - (37.33) Excision or destruction of other lesion or tissue of heart, open approach
      - Maze procedure
    - (37.34) Excision or destruction of other lesion or tissue of heart, other approach
    - (37.35) Partial ventriculectomy
      - Ventricular reduction surgery
  - (37.4) Repair of heart and pericardium
  - (37.5) Heart replacement procedures
    - (37.51) Heart transplantation
    - (37.52) Implantation of total replacement heart system
      - Artificial heart
  - (37.6) Implantation of heart and circulatory assist system
  - (37.7) Insertion, revision, replacement, and removal of pacemaker leads; insertion of temporary pacemaker system; or revision of cardiac device pocket
  - (37.8) Insertion, replacement, removal, and revision of pacemaker device
  - (37.9) Other operations on heart and pericardium

=== Vessels ===
- (38) Incision, excision, and occlusion of vessels
  - (38.0) Incision of vessel
    - Thrombectomy
  - (38.1) Endarterectomy
  - (38.2) Diagnostic procedures on blood vessels
  - (38.3) Resection of vessel with anastomosis
  - (38.4) Resection of vessel with replacement
  - (38.5) Ligation and stripping of varicose veins
  - (38.6) Other excision of vessel
  - (38.7) Interruption of the vena cava
  - (38.8) Other surgical occlusion of vessels
  - (38.9) Puncture of vessel
    - (38.91) Arterial catheterization
    - (38.92) Umbilical vein catheterization
    - (38.93) Venous catheterization, not elsewhere classified
    - (38.94) Venous cutdown
    - (38.95) Venous catheterization for renal dialysis
    - (38.98) Other puncture of artery
    - (38.99) Other puncture of vein
- (39) Other operations on vessels
  - (39.0) Systemic to pulmonary artery shunt
  - (39.1) Intra-abdominal venous shunt
    - transjugular intrahepatic portosystemic shunt (TIPS)
  - (39.2) Other shunt or vascular bypass
  - (39.3) Suture of vessel
  - (39.4) Revision of vascular procedure
  - (39.5) Other repair of vessels
  - (39.6) Extracorporeal circulation and procedures auxiliary to heart surgery
    - (39.61) Extracorporeal circulation auxiliary to open heart surgery
      - Cardiopulmonary bypass
    - (39.62) Hypothermia (systemic) incidental to open heart surgery
    - (39.63) Cardioplegia
    - (39.64) Intraoperative cardiac pacemaker
    - (39.65) Extracorporeal membrane oxygenation (ECMO)
    - (39.66) Percutaneous cardiopulmonary bypass
  - (39.7) Endovascular repair of vessel
  - (39.8) Operations on carotid body and other vascular bodies
  - (39.9) Other operations on vessels
    - (39.90) Insertion of non-drug-eluting peripheral vessel stent(s)
    - (39.91) Freeing of vessel
    - (39.92) Injection of sclerosing agent into vein
    - (39.93) Insertion of vessel-to-vessel cannula
    - (39.94) Replacement of vessel-to-vessel cannula
    - (39.95) Hemodialysis
      - Artificial kidney
      - Hemodiafiltration
      - Hemofiltration
      - Renal dialysis
    - (39.96) Total body perfusion
    - (39.97) Other perfusionge, not otherwise specified
    - (39.98) Control of hemorrhage, not otherwise specified
    - (39.99) Other operations on vessels

== (40–41) Operations on the hemic and lymphatic system ==
- (40) Operations on lymphatic system
  - (40.0) Incision of lymphatic structures
  - (40.1) Diagnostic procedures on lymphatic structures
  - (40.2) Simple excision of lymphatic structure
    - (40.21) Excision of deep cervical lymph node
    - (40.22) Excision of internal mammary lymph node
    - (40.23) Excision of axillary lymph node
    - (40.24) Excision of inguinal lymph node
    - (40.29) Simple excision of other lymphatic structure
      - Simple lymphadenectomy
  - (40.3) Regional lymph node excision
  - (40.4) Radical excision of cervical lymph nodes
    - (40.40) Radical neck dissection, not otherwise specified
    - (40.41) Radical neck dissection, unilateral
    - (40.42) Radical neck dissection, bilateral
  - (40.5) Radical excision of other lymph nodes
  - (40.6) Operations on thoracic duct
  - (40.9) Other operations on lymphatic structures
- (41) Operations on bone marrow and spleen
  - (41.0) Bone marrow or hematopoietic stem cell transplant
  - (41.1) Puncture of spleen
  - (41.2) Splenotomy
  - (41.3) Diagnostic procedures on bone marrow and spleen
  - (41.4) Excision or destruction of lesion or tissue of spleen
    - (41.41) Marsupialization of splenic cyst
    - (41.42) Excision of lesion or tissue of spleen
    - (41.43) Partial splenectomy
  - (41.5) Total splenectomy
  - (41.9) Other operations on spleen and bone marrow

== (42–54) Operations on the digestive system ==
- (42) Operations on esophagus
  - (42.4) Excision of esophagus
    - (42.40) Esophagectomy, not otherwise specified
- (43) Incision and excision of stomach
  - (43.0) Gastrotomy
  - (43.1) Gastrostomy
    - (43.11) Percutaneous (endoscopic) gastrostomy (PEG)
  - (43.3) Pyloromyotomy
  - (43.4) Local excision or destruction of lesion or tissue of stomach
  - (43.5) Partial gastrectomy with anastomosis to esophagus
  - (43.6) Partial gastrectomy with anastomosis to duodenum
  - (43.7) Partial gastrectomy with anastomosis to jejunum
  - (43.8) Other partial gastrectomy
  - (43.9) Total gastrectomy
- (44) Other operations on stomach
  - (44.0) Vagotomy
  - (44.3) Gastroenterostomy without gastrectomy
    - (44.31) High gastric bypass
    - (44.32) Percutaneous (endoscopic) gastrojejunostomy
    - (44.38) Laparoscopic gastroenterostomy
    - (44.39) Other gastroenterostomy
- (45) Incision, excision, and anastomosis of intestine
  - (45.1) Diagnostic procedures on small intestine
    - (45.11) Transabdominal endoscopy of small intestine
    - (45.12) Endoscopy of small intestine through artificial stoma
    - (45.13) Other endoscopy of small intestine
      - Esophagogastroduodenoscopy (EGD)
    - (45.14) Closed (endoscopic) biopsy of small intestine
    - (45.15) Open biopsy of small intestine
    - (45.16) Esophagogastroduodenoscopy (EGD) with closed biopsy
    - (45.19) Other diagnostic procedures on small intestine
  - (45.2) Diagnostic procedures on large intestine
    - (45.23) Colonoscopy
  - (45.7) Partial excision of large intestine
    - (45.73) Right hemicolectomy
  - (45.8) Total intra-abdominal colectomy
- (46) Other operations on intestine
  - (46.1) Colostomy
  - (46.2) Ileostomy
  - (46.3) Other enterostomy
  - (46.4) Revision of intestinal stoma
  - (46.5) Closure of intestinal stoma
  - (46.6) Fixation of intestine
  - (46.7) Other repair of intestine
  - (46.8) Dilation and manipulation of intestine
  - (46.9) Other operations on intestines
    - (46.91) Myotomy of sigmoid colon
    - (46.92) Myotomy of other parts of colon
    - (46.93) Revision of anastomosis of small intestine
      - jejunoileal bypass
    - (46.94) Revision of anastomosis of large intestine
    - (46.95) Local perfusion of small intestine
    - (46.96) Local perfusion of large intestine
    - (46.97) Transplant of intestine
    - (46.99) Other
- (47) Operations on appendix
  - (47.0) Appendectomy
- (48) Operations on rectum, rectosigmoid and perirectal tissue
  - (48.2) Diagnostic procedures on rectum, rectosigmoid and perirectal tissue
    - (48.21) Transabdominal proctosigmoidoscopy
    - (48.22) Proctosigmoidoscopy through artificial stoma
    - (48.23) Rigid proctosigmoidoscopy
    - (48.24) Closed (endoscopic) biopsy of rectum
    - (48.25) Open biopsy of rectum
    - (48.26) Biopsy of perirectal tissue
    - (48.29) Other diagnostic procedures on rectum, rectosigmoid and perirectal tissue
- (49) Operations on anus
  - (49.0) Incision or excision of perianal tissue
  - (49.1) Incision or excision of anal fistula
  - (49.2) Diagnostic procedures on anus and perianal tissue
  - (49.3) Local excision or destruction of other lesion or tissue of anus
  - (49.4) Procedures on hemorrhoids
    - (49.46) Excision of hemorrhoids
      - Hemorrhoidectomy NOS
  - (49.5) Division of anal sphincter
    - (49.51) Left lateral anal sphincterotomy
    - (49.52) Posterior anal sphincterotomy
    - (49.59) Other anal sphincterotomy
  - (49.6) Excision of anus
  - (49.7) Repair of anus
  - (49.9) Other operations on anus
- (50) Operations on liver
  - (50.0) Hepatotomy
  - (50.1) Diagnostic procedures on liver
  - (50.2) Local excision or destruction of liver tissue or lesion
    - (50.21) Marsupialization of lesion of liver
    - (50.22) Partial hepatectomy
    - (50.29) Other destruction of lesion of liver
  - (50.3) Lobectomy of liver
  - (50.4) Total hepatectomy
  - (50.5) Liver transplant
  - (50.6) Repair of liver
  - (50.9) Other operations on liver
- (51) Operations on gallbladder and biliary tract
  - (51.0) Cholecystotomy and cholecystostomy
  - (51.1) Diagnostic procedures on biliary tract
    - (51.10) Endoscopic retrograde cholangiopancreatography (ERCP)
  - (51.2) Cholecystectomy
  - (51.3) Anastomosis of gallbladder or bile duct
  - (51.4) Incision of bile duct for relief of obstruction
  - (51.5) Other incision of bile duct
  - (51.6) Local excision or destruction of lesion or tissue of biliary ducts and sphincter of Oddi
  - (51.7) Repair of bile ducts
  - (51.8) Other operations on biliary ducts and sphincter of Oddi
  - (51.9) Other operations on biliary tract
- (52) Operations on pancreas
  - (52.0) Pancreatotomy
  - (52.1) Diagnostic procedures on pancreas
  - (52.2) Local excision or destruction of pancreas and pancreatic duct
  - (52.3) Marsupialization of pancreatic cyst
  - (52.4) Internal drainage of pancreatic cyst
  - (52.5) Partial pancreatectomy
  - (52.6) Total pancreatectomy
  - (52.7) Radical pancreaticoduodenectomy
  - (52.8) Transplant of pancreas
  - (52.9) Other operations on pancreas
    - (52.96) Anastomosis of pancreas
- (53) Repair of hernia
  - hernia repair
- (54) Other operations on abdominal region
  - (54.1) Laparotomy
  - (54.9) Other operations of abdominal region
    - (54.91) Percutaneous abdominal drainage
      - Paracentesis

== (55–59) Operations on the urinary system ==
- (55) Operations on kidney
  - (55.0) Nephrotomy and nephrostomy
    - (55.02) Nephrostomy
  - (55.1) Pyelotomy and pyelostomy
  - (55.2) Diagnostic procedures on kidney
  - (55.3) Local excision or destruction of lesion or tissue of kidney
  - (55.4) Partial nephrectomy
  - (55.5) Complete nephrectomy
  - (55.6) Transplant of kidney
  - (55.7) Nephropexy
  - (55.8) Other repair of kidney
    - (55.81) Suture of laceration of kidney
    - (55.82) Closure of nephrostomy and pyelostomy
    - (55.83) Closure of other fistula of kidney
    - (55.84) Reduction of torsion of renal pedicle
    - (55.85) Symphysiotomy for horseshoe kidney
    - (55.86) Anastomosis of kidney
    - (55.87) Correction of ureteropelvic junction
    - (55.89) Other
  - (55.9) Other operations on kidney
- (56) Operations on ureter
  - (56.0) Transurethral removal of obstruction from ureter and renal pelvis
  - (56.1) Ureteral meatotomy
  - (56.2) Ureterotomy
  - (56.3) Diagnostic procedures on ureter
    - (56.31) Ureteroscopy
  - (56.4) Ureterectomy
  - (56.5) Cutaneous uretero-ileostomy
  - (56.6) Other external urinary diversion
    - (56.61) Formation of other cutaneous ureterostomy
      - Ureterostomy NOS
  - (56.7) Other anastomosis or bypass of ureter
    - (56.71) Urinary diversion to intestine
      - Internal urinary diversion NOS
  - (56.8) Repair of ureter
  - (56.9) Other operations on ureter
- (57) Operations on urinary bladder
  - (57.0) Transurethral clearance of bladder
  - (57.1) Cystotomy and cystostomy
  - (57.2) Vesicostomy
  - (57.3) Diagnostic procedures on bladder
  - (57.4) Transurethral excision or destruction of bladder tissue
  - (57.5) Other excision or destruction of bladder tissue
  - (57.6) Partial cystectomy
  - (57.7) Total cystectomy
  - (57.8) Other repair of urinary bladder
  - (57.9) Other operations on bladder
- (58) Operations on urethra
  - (58.0) Urethrotomy
  - (58.1) Urethral meatotomy
  - (58.2) Diagnostic procedures on urethra
  - (58.3) Excision or destruction of lesion or tissue of urethra
  - (58.4) Repair of urethra
  - (58.5) Release of urethral stricture
  - (58.6) Dilation of urethra
  - (58.9) Other operations on urethra and periurethral tissue
- (59) Other operations on urinary tract

== (60–64) Operations on the male genital organs ==
- (60) Operations on prostate and seminal vesicles
  - (60.0) Incision of prostate
  - (60.1) Diagnostic procedures on prostate and seminal vesicles
  - (60.2) Transurethral prostatectomy
    - (60.21) Transurethral (ultrasound) guided laser induced prostatectomy (TULIP)
    - (60.29) Other transurethral prostatectomy
      - Transurethral resection of prostate (TURP)
  - (60.3) Suprapubic prostatectomy
  - (60.4) Retropubic prostatectomy
  - (60.5) Radical prostatectomy
  - (60.6) Other prostatectomy
  - (60.7) Operations on seminal vesicles
  - (60.8) Incision or excision of periprostatic tissue
  - (60.9) Other operations on prostate
- (61) Operations on scrotum and tunica vaginalis
- (62) Operations on testes
- (63) Operations on spermatic cord, epididymis, and vas deferens
  - (63.7) Vasectomy and ligation of vas deferens
    - (63.73) Vasectomy
  - (63.8) Repair of vas deferens and epididymis
    - (63.82) Reconstruction of surgically divided vas deferens
- (64) Operations on penis
  - (64.0) Circumcision
  - (64.1) Diagnostic procedures on the penis
  - (64.2) Local excision or destruction of lesion of penis
  - (64.3) Amputation of penis
  - (64.4) Repair and plastic operation on penis
  - (64.5) Operations for sex transformation, not elsewhere classified
  - (64.9) Other operations on male genital organs
    - (64.91) Dorsal or lateral slit of prepuce
    - (64.92) Incision of penis
    - (64.93) Division of penile adhesions
    - (64.94) Fitting of external prosthesis of penis
      - Penlie prosthesis NOS
    - (64.95) Insertion or replacement of non-inflatable penlie prosthesis
    - (64.96) Removal of internal prosthesis of penis
    - (64.97) Insertion or replacement of inflatable penlie prosthesis
    - (64.98) Other operations on penis
    - (64.99) Other

== (65–71) Operations on the female genital organs ==
- (65) Operations on ovary
  - (65.0) Oophorotomy
  - (65.1) Diagnostic procedures on ovaries
  - (65.2) Local excision or destruction of ovarian lesion or tissue
  - (65.3) Unilateral oophorectomy
  - (65.4) Unilateral salpingo-oophorectomy
  - (65.5) Bilateral oophorectomy
  - (65.6) Bilateral salpingo-oophorectomy
  - (65.7) Repair of ovary
  - (65.8) Lysis of adhesions of ovary and fallopian tube
  - (65.9) Other operations on ovary
- (66) Operations on fallopian tubes
  - (66.0) Salpingotomy and salpingostomy
  - (66.1) Diagnostic procedures on fallopian tubes
  - (66.2) Bilateral endoscopic destruction or occlusion of fallopian tubes
  - (66.3) Other bilateral destruction or occlusion of fallopian tubes
  - (66.4) Total unilateral salpingectomy
  - (66.5) Total bilateral salpingectomy
  - (66.6) Other salpingectomy
  - (66.7) Repair of fallopian tube
  - (66.8) Insufflation of fallopian tube
  - (66.9) Other operations on fallopian tubes
- (67) Operations on cervix
  - (67.0) Dilation of cervical canal, excludes Dilation and curettage
  - (67.1) Diagnostic procedures on cervix
  - (67.2) Conization of cervix excluding electrical/cryo
  - (67.3) Other excision or destruction of lesion or tissue of cervix
- (68) Other incision and excision of uterus
  - (68.0) Hysterotomy
  - (68.1) Diagnostic procedures on uterus and supporting structures
    - (68.12) Hysteroscopy
  - (68.2) Excision or destruction of lesion or tissue of uterus
  - (68.3) Subtotal abdominal hysterectomy
  - (68.4) Total abdominal hysterectomy
  - (68.5) Vaginal hysterectomy
  - (68.6) Radical abdominal hysterectomy
  - (68.7) Radical vaginal hysterectomy
  - (68.8) Pelvic exenteration
  - (68.9) Other and unspecified hysterectomy
- (69) Other operations on uterus and supporting structures
  - (69.0) Dilation and curettage of uterus
  - (69.1) Excision or destruction of lesion or tissue of uterus and supporting structures
  - (69.2) Repair of uterine supporting structures
  - (69.3) Paracervical uterine denervation
  - (69.4) Uterine repair
  - (69.5) Aspiration curettage of uterus
  - (69.6) Menstrual extraction or regulation
  - (69.7) Insertion of intrauterine contraceptive device
  - (69.9) Other operations on uterus, cervix, and supporting structures
- (70) Operations on vagina and rectouterine pouch
  - (70.0) Culdocentesis
  - (70.1) Incision of vagina and rectouterine pouch
    - (70.11) Hymenotomy
    - (70.12) Culdotomy
    - (70.13) Lysis of intraluminal adhesions of vagina
    - (70.14) Other vaginotomy
  - (70.2) Diagnostic procedures on vagina and rectouterine pouch
  - (70.3) Local excision or destruction of vagina and rectouterine pouch
  - (70.4) Obliteration and total excision of vagina
    - Vaginectomy
  - (70.5) Repair of cystocele and rectocele
  - (70.6) Vaginal construction and reconstruction
  - (70.7) Other repair of vagina
  - (70.8) Obliteration of vaginal vault
  - (70.9) Other operations on vagina and rectouterine pouch
- (71) Operations on vulva and perineum
  - (71.0) Incision of vulva and perineum
  - (71.1) Diagnostic procedures on vulva
  - (71.2) Operations on Bartholin's gland
  - (71.3) Other local excision or destruction of vulva and perineum
  - (71.4) Operations on clitoris
  - (71.5) Radical vulvectomy
  - (71.6) Other vulvectomy
  - (71.7) Repair of vulva and perineum
  - (71.8) Other operations on vulva
  - (71.9) Other operations on female genital organs

== (72–75) Obstetrical procedures ==
- (72) Forceps, vacuum, and breech delivery
- (73) Other procedures inducing or assisting delivery
  - (73.0) Artificial rupture of membranes
    - (73.01) Induction of labor by artificial rupture of membranes
    - (73.09) Other artificial rupture of membranes
      - Amniotomy
  - (73.1) Other surgical induction of labor
  - (73.2) Internal and combined version and extraction
  - (73.3) Failed forceps
  - (73.4) Medical induction of labor
  - (73.5) Manually assisted delivery
  - (73.6) Episiotomy
  - (73.8) Operations on fetus to facilitate delivery
  - (73.9) Other operations assisting delivery
  - (73.91) External version
  - (73.92) Replacement of prolapsed umbilical cord
  - (73.93) Incision of cervix to assist delivery
  - (73.94) Pubiotomy to assist delivery
    - Obstetrical symphysiotomy
  - (73.99) Other
- (74) Cesarean section and removal of fetus
- (75) Other obstetric operations
  - (75.0) Intra-amniotic injection for abortion
  - (75.1) Diagnostic amniocentesis
  - (75.2) Intrauterine transfusion
  - (75.3) Other intrauterine operations on fetus and amnion
    - (75.31) Amnioscopy
      - Fetoscopy
      - Laparoamnioscopy
    - (75.32) Fetal EKG (scalp)
    - (75.33) Fetal blood sampling and biopsy
      - Chorionic villus sampling
    - (75.34) Other fetal monitoring
    - (75.35) Other diagnostic procedures on fetus and amnion
    - (75.36) Correction of fetal defect
    - (75.37) Amnioinfusion
    - (75.38) Fetal pulse oximetry
  - (75.4) Manual removal of retained placenta
  - (75.5) Repair of current obstetric laceration of uterus
  - (75.6) Repair of other current obstetric laceration
  - (75.7) Manual exploration of uterine cavity, postpartum
  - (75.8) Obstetric tamponade of uterus or vagina
  - (75.9) Other obstetric operations

== (76–84) Operations on the musculoskeletal system ==
- (76) Operations on facial bones and joints
  - (76.0) Incision of facial bone without division
  - (76.1) Diagnostic procedures on facial bones and joints
  - (76.2) Local excision or destruction of lesion of facial bone
  - (76.3) Partial ostectomy of facial bone
  - (76.4) Excision and reconstruction of facial bones
  - (76.5) Temporomandibular arthroplasty
  - (76.6) Other facial bone repair and orthognathic surgery
    - (76.68) Augmentation genioplasty
      - Mentoplasty NOS
  - (76.7) Reduction of facial fracture
  - (76.9) Other operations on facial bones and joints
- (77) Incision, excision, and division of other bones
  - (77.0) Sequestrectomy
  - (77.1) Other incision of bone without division
  - (77.2) Wedge osteotomy
  - (77.3) Other division of bone
  - (77.4) Biopsy of bone
  - (77.5) Excision and repair of bunion and other toe deformities
  - (77.6) Local excision of lesion or tissue of bone
  - (77.7) Excision of bone for graft
  - (77.8) Other partial ostectomy
  - (77.9) Total ostectomy
- (78) Other operations on bones, except facial bones
  - (78.0) Bone graft
  - (78.1) Application of external fixator device
  - (78.2) Limb shortening procedures
  - (78.3) Limb lengthening procedures
  - (78.4) Other repair or plastic operations on bone
  - (78.5) Internal fixation of bone without fracture reduction
  - (78.6) Removal of implanted devices from bone
  - (78.7) Osteoclasis
  - (78.8) Diagnostic procedures on bone, not elsewhere classified
  - (78.9) Insertion of bone growth stimulator
- (79) Reduction of fracture and dislocation
  - (79.0) Closed reduction of fracture without internal fixation
  - (79.1) Closed reduction of fracture with internal fixation
  - (79.2) Open reduction of fracture without internal fixation
  - (79.3) Open reduction of fracture with internal fixation
  - (79.4) Closed reduction of separated epiphysis
  - (79.5) Open reduction of separated epiphysis
  - (79.6) Debridement of open fracture site
  - (79.7) Closed reduction of dislocation
  - (79.8) Open reduction of dislocation
  - (79.9) Unspecified operation on bone injury
- (80) Incision and excision of joint structures
  - (80.2) Arthroscopy
  - (80.5) Excision or destruction of intervertebral disc
    - (80.51) Excision of intervertebral disc
      - Diskectomy
- (81) Repair and plastic operations on joint structures
  - (81.0) Spinal fusion
  - (81.1) Arthrodesis and arthroereisis of foot and ankle
  - (81.2) Arthrodesis of other joint
  - (81.3) Refusion of spine
  - (81.4) Other repair of joint of lower extremity
  - (81.5) Joint replacement of lower extremity
    - (81.51) Total hip replacement
    - (81.52) Partial hip replacement
    - (81.53) Revision of hip replacement, not otherwise specified
    - (81.54) Total knee replacement
    - (81.55) Revision of knee replacement, not otherwise specified
    - (81.56) Total ankle replacement
    - (81.57) Replacement of joint of foot and toe
    - (81.59) Revision of joint replacement of lower extremity, not elsewhere classified
  - (81.6) Other procedures on spine
  - (81.7) Arthroplasty and repair of hand, fingers and wrist
  - (81.8) Arthroplasty and repair of shoulder and elbow
    - (81.80) Total shoulder replacement
    - (81.81) Partial shoulder replacement
    - (81.82) Repair of recurrent dislocation of shoulder
    - (81.83) Other repair of shoulder
    - (81.84) Total elbow replacement
    - (81.85) Other repair of elbow
  - (81.9) Other operations on joint structures
- (82) Operations on muscle, tendon, and fascia of hand
  - (82.0) Incision of muscle, tendon, fascia, and bursa of hand
  - (82.1) Division of muscle, tendon, and fascia of hand
  - (82.2) Excision of lesion of muscle, tendon, and fascia of hand
  - (82.3) Other excision of soft tissue of hand
  - (82.4) Suture of muscle, tendon, and fascia of hand
  - (82.5) Transplantation of muscle and tendon of hand
  - (82.6) Reconstruction of thumb
  - (82.7) Plastic operation on hand with graft or implant
  - (82.8) Other plastic operations on hand
  - (82.9) Other operations on muscle, tendon, and fascia of hand
- (83) Operations on muscle, tendon, fascia, and bursa, except hand
  - (83.0) Incision of muscle, tendon, fascia, and bursa
    - (83.01) Exploration of tendon sheath
    - (83.02) Myotomy
    - (83.03) Bursotomy
    - (83.09) Other incision of soft tissue
  - (83.1) Division of muscle, tendon, and fascia
    - (83.11) Achillotenotomy
    - (83.12) Adductor tenotomy of hip
    - (83.13) Other tenotomy
    - (83.14) Fasciotomy
    - (83.19) Other division of soft tissue
  - (83.2) Diagnostic procedures on muscle, tendon, fascia, and bursa, including that of hand
  - (83.3) Excision of lesion of muscle, tendon, fascia, and bursa
  - (83.4) Other excision of muscle, tendon, and fascia
  - (83.5) Bursectomy
  - (83.6) Suture of muscle, tendon, and fascia
  - (83.7) Reconstruction of muscle and tendon
  - (83.8) Other plastic operations on muscle, tendon, and fascia
  - (83.9) Other operations on muscle, tendon, fascia, and bursa
- (84) Other procedures on musculoskeletal system
  - (84.0) Amputation of upper limb
  - (84.1) Amputation of lower limb
    - (84.10) Lower limb amputation, not otherwise specified
    - (84.11) Amputation of toe
    - (84.12) Amputation through foot
    - (84.13) Disarticulation of ankle
    - (84.14) Amputation of ankle through malleoli of tibia and fibula
    - (84.15) Other amputation below knee
    - (84.16) Disarticulation of knee
    - (84.17) Amputation above knee
    - (84.18) Disarticulation of hip
    - (84.19) Abdominopelvic amputation
      - Hemipelvectomy
  - (84.2) Reattachment of extremity
  - (84.3) Revision of amputation stump
  - (84.4) Implantation or fitting of prosthetic limb device
  - (84.5) Implantation of other musculoskeletal devices and substances
    - (84.51) Insertion of interbody spinal fusion device
    - (84.52) Insertion of recombinant bone morphogenetic protein
    - (84.53) Implantation of internal limb lengthening device with kinetic distraction
    - (84.54) Implantation of other internal limb lengthening device
    - (84.55) Insertion of bone void filler
    - (84.56) Insertion of (cement) spacer
    - (84.57) Removal of (cement) spacer
    - (84.58) Implantation of interspinous process decompression device
    - (84.59) Insertion of other spinal devices
  - (84.6) Replacement of spinal disc
  - (84.7) Adjunct codes for external fixator devices
  - (84.9) Other operations on musculoskeletal system

== (85–86) Operations on the integumentary system ==
- (85) Operations on the breast
  - (85.0) Mastotomy
  - (85.1) Diagnostic procedures on breast
  - (85.2) Excision or destruction of breast tissue
    - (85.21) Local excision of lesion of breast
      - Lumpectomy
  - (85.3) Reduction mammoplasty and subcutaneous mammectomy
  - (85.4) Mastectomy
  - (85.5) Augmentation mammoplasty
  - (85.6) Mastopexy
  - (85.7) Total reconstruction of breast
  - (85.8) Other repair and plastic operations on breast
  - (85.9) Other operations on the breast
- (86) Operations on skin and subcutaneous tissue
  - (86.0) Incision of skin and subcutaneous tissue
    - (86.01) Aspiration of skin and subcutaneous tissue
    - (86.02) Injection or tattooing of skin lesion or defect
    - (86.03) Incision of pilonidal sinus or cyst
    - (86.04) Other incision with drainage of skin and subcutaneous tissue
    - (86.05) Incision with removal of foreign body or device from skin and subcutaneous tissue
    - (86.06) Insertion of totally implantable infusion pump
    - (86.07) Insertion of totally implantable vascular access device (VAD)
    - (86.09) Other incision of skin and subcutaneous tissue
      - Escharotomy
  - (86.1) Diagnostic procedures on skin and subcutaneous tissue
  - (86.2) Excision or destruction of lesion or tissue of skin and subcutaneous tissue
  - (86.3) Other local excision or destruction of lesion or tissue of skin and subcutaneous tissue
  - (86.4) Radical excision of skin lesion
  - (86.5) Suture or other closure of skin and subcutaneous tissue
  - (86.6) Free skin graft
    - (86.60) Free skin graft, not otherwise specified
    - (86.61) Full-thickness skin graft to hand
    - (86.62) Other skin graft to hand
    - (86.63) Full-thickness skin graft to other sites
    - (86.64) Hair transplant
    - (86.65) Heterograft to skin
    - (86.66) Homograft to skin
  - (86.7) Pedicle grafts or flaps
  - (86.8) Other repair and reconstruction of skin and subcutaneous tissue
  - (86.9) Other operations on skin and subcutaneous tissue

== (87–99) Miscellaneous diagnostic and therapeutic procedures ==
=== Diagnostic radiology ===
- (87) Diagnostic radiology
  - (87.3) Soft tissue x-ray of thorax
  - (87.4) Other x-ray of thorax
  - (87.7) X-ray of urinary system
    - (87.71) Computerized axial tomography of kidney
      - CAT scan of kidney
    - (87.72) Other nephrotomogram
    - (87.73) Intravenous pyelogram
      - Diuretic infusion pyelogram
    - (87.74) Retrograde pyelogram
    - (87.75) Percutaneous pyelogram
    - (87.76) Retrograde cystourethrogram
    - (87.77) Other cystogram
    - (87.78) Ileal conduitogram
    - (87.79) Other x-ray of the urinary system
      - KUB x-ray
- (88) Other diagnostic radiology and related techniques
  - (88.0) Soft tissue x-ray of abdomen
  - (88.1) Other x-ray of abdomen
  - (88.2) Skeletal x-ray of extremities and pelvis
  - (88.3) Other x-ray
  - (88.4) Arteriography using contrast material
  - (88.5) Angiocardiography using contrast material
  - (88.6) Phlebography
  - (88.7) Diagnostic ultrasound
  - (88.8) Thermography
  - (88.9) Other diagnostic imaging
    - (88.90) Diagnostic imaging, not elsewhere classified
    - (88.91) Magnetic resonance imaging of brain and brain stem
    - (88.92) Magnetic resonance imaging of chest and myocardium
    - (88.93) Magnetic resonance imaging of spinal canal
    - (88.94) Magnetic resonance imaging of musculoskeletal
    - (88.95) Magnetic resonance imaging of pelvis, prostate, and bladder
    - (88.96) Other intraoperative magnetic resonance imaging
    - (88.97) Magnetic resonance imaging of other and unspecified sites
    - (88.98) Bone mineral density studies

=== Interview, evaluation, consultation, and examination ===
- (89) Interview, evaluation, consultation, and examination
  - (89.0) Diagnostic interview, consultation, and evaluation
  - (89.1) Anatomic and physiologic measurements and manual examinations—nervous system and sense organs
    - (89.14) Electroencephalogram
  - (89.2) Anatomic and physiologic measurements and manual examinations -- genitourinary system
    - (89.21) Urinary manometry
    - (89.22) Cystometrogram
    - (89.23) Urethral sphincter electromyogram
    - (89.24) Uroflowmetry (UFR)
    - (89.25) Urethral pressure profile (UPP)
    - (89.26) Gynecological examination
    - (89.29) Other nonoperative genitourinary system measurements
  - (89.3) Other anatomic and physiologic measurements and manual examinations
  - (89.4) Cardiac stress tests, pacemaker and defibrillator checks
  - (89.5) Other nonoperative cardiac and vascular diagnostic procedures
  - (89.6) Circulatory monitoring
  - (89.7) General physical examination
  - (89.8) Autopsy
- (90-91) Microscopic examination
  - fourth-digit codes:
  - 1 bacterial smear
  - 2 culture
  - 3 culture and sensitivity
  - 4 parasitology
  - 5 toxicology
  - 6 cell block and Papanicolaou smear
  - 9 other microscopic examination
  - (90.0) specimen from nervous system and of spinal fluid
  - (90.1) specimen from endocrine gland, not elsewhere classified
  - (90.2) specimen from eye
  - (90.3) specimen from ear, nose, throat, and larynx
  - (90.4) specimen from trachea, bronchus, pleura, lung, and other thoracic specimen, and of sputum
  - (90.5) blood
  - (90.6) specimen from spleen and of bone marrow
  - (90.7) specimen from lymph node and of lymph
  - (90.8) specimen from upper gastrointestinal tract and of vomitus
  - (90.9) specimen from lower gastrointestinal tract and of stool
  - (91.0) specimen from liver, biliary tract, and pancreas
  - (91.1) peritoneal and retroperitoneal specimen
  - (91.2) specimen from kidney, ureter, perirenal and periureteral tissue
  - (91.3) specimen from bladder, urethra, prostate, seminal vesicle, perivesical tissue, and of urine and semen
  - (91.4) specimen from female genital tract
  - (91.5) specimen from musculoskeletal system and of joint fluid
  - (91.6) specimen from skin and other integument
  - (91.7) specimen from operative wound
  - (91.8) specimen from other site
  - (91.9) specimen from unspecified site

=== Nuclear medicine ===
- (92) Nuclear medicine
  - (92.0) Radioisotope scan and function study
  - (92.1) Other radioisotope scan
  - (92.2) Therapeutic radiology and nuclear medicine
  - (92.3) Stereotactic radiosurgery

=== Physical therapy, respiratory therapy, rehabilitation, and related procedures ===
- (93) Physical therapy, respiratory therapy, rehabilitation, and related procedures
  - (93.0) Diagnostic physical therapy
  - (93.1) Physical therapy exercises
  - (93.2) Other physical therapy musculoskeletal manipulations
  - (93.3) Other physical therapy therapeutic procedures
    - (93.31) Assisted exercise in pool
    - (93.32) Whirlpool treatment
    - (93.33) Other hydrotherapy
    - (93.34) Diathermy
    - (93.35) Other heat therapy
    - (93.36) Cardiac retraining
    - (93.37) Prenatal training
    - (93.38) Combined physical therapy without mention of the components
    - (93.39) Other physical therapy
  - (93.4) Skeletal traction and other traction
  - (93.5) Other immobilization, pressure, and attention to wound
    - (93.52) Application of neck support
      - Application of cervical collar
      - Application of Minerva jacket
  - (93.6) Osteopathic manipulative treatment
  - (93.7) Speech and reading rehabilitation and rehabilitation of the blind
  - (93.8) Other rehabilitation therapy
    - (93.81) Recreation therapy
    - (93.82) Educational therapy
    - (93.83) Occupational therapy
    - (93.84) Music therapy
    - (93.85) Vocational rehabilitation
    - (93.89) Rehabilitation, not elsewhere classified
  - (93.9) Respiratory therapy

=== Procedures related to the psyche ===
- (94) Procedures related to the psyche
  - (94.0) Psychologic evaluation and testing
    - (94.01) Administration of intelligence test
      - Administration of Stanford-Binet
      - Administration of Wechsler Adult Intelligence Scale
      - Administration of Wechsler Intelligence Scale for Children
    - (94.02) Administration of psychologic test
      - Administration of Bender Visual-Motor Gestalt Test
      - Administration of Benton Visual Retention Test
      - Administration of Minnesota Multiphasic Personality Inventory
      - Administration of Wechsler Memory Scale
    - (94.03) Character analysis
    - (94.08) Other psychologic evaluation and testing
    - (94.09) Psychologic mental status determination, not otherwise specified
  - (94.1) Psychiatric interviews, consultations, and evaluations
    - (94.11) Psychiatric mental status determination
    - (94.12) Routine psychiatric visit, not otherwise specified
    - (94.13) Psychiatric commitment evaluation
    - (94.19) Other psychiatric interview and evaluation
  - (94.2) Psychiatric somatotherapy
    - (94.21) Narcoanalysis
    - (94.22) Lithium therapy
    - (94.23) Neuroleptic therapy
    - (94.24) Chemical shock therapy
    - (94.25) Other psychiatric drug therapy
    - (94.26) Subconvulsive electroshock therapy
    - (94.27) Other electroshock therapy
      - Electroconvulsive therapy (ECT)
    - (94.29) Other psychiatric somatotherapy
  - (94.3) Individual psychotherapy
    - (94.31) Psychoanalysis
    - (94.32) Hypnotherapy
    - (94.33) Behavior therapy
      - Aversion therapy
      - Behavior modification
      - Desensitization therapy
      - Extinction therapy
      - Relaxation training
      - Token economy
    - (94.39) Other individual psychotherapy
    - Biofeedback
  - (94.4) Other psychotherapy and counselling
    - (94.41) Group therapy for psychosexual dysfunction
    - (94.42) Family therapy
    - (94.43) Psychodrama
    - (94.44) Other group therapy
    - (94.45) Drug addiction counselling
    - (94.46) Alcoholism counselling
    - (94.49) Other counselling
  - (94.5) Referral for psychologic rehabilitation
  - (94.6) Alcohol and drug rehabilitation and detoxification

=== Ophthalmologic and otologic diagnosis and treatment ===
- (95) Ophthalmologic and otologic diagnosis and treatment
  - (95.0) General and subjective eye examination
    - (95.01) Limited eye examination
    - (95.02) Comprehensive eye examination
    - (95.03) Extended ophthalmologic work-up
    - (95.04) Eye examination under anesthesia
    - (95.05) Visual field study
    - (95.06) Color vision study
    - (95.07) Dark adaptation study
    - (95.09) Eye examination, not otherwise specified
  - (95.1) Examinations of form and structure of eye
    - (95.11) Fundus photography
    - (95.12) Fluorescein angiography or angioscopy of eye
    - (95.13) Ultrasound study of eye
    - (95.14) X-ray study of eye
    - (95.15) Ocular motility study
    - (95.16) P32 and other tracer studies of eye
  - (95.2) Objective functional tests of eye
    - (95.21) Electroretinogram (ERG)
    - (95.22) Electro-oculogram (EOG)
    - (95.23) Visual evoked potential (VEP)
    - (95.24) Electronystagmogram (ENG)
    - (95.25) Electromyogram of eye (EMG)
    - (95.26) Tonography, provocative tests, and other glaucoma testing
  - (95.3) Special vision services
  - (95.4) Nonoperative procedures related to hearing
    - (95.41) Audiometry
    - (95.42) Clinical test of hearing
    - (95.43) Audiological evaluation
    - (95.44) Clinical vestibular function tests
    - (95.45) Rotation tests
    - (95.49) Other nonoperative procedures related to hearing

=== Nonoperative intubation and irrigation ===
- (96) Nonoperative intubation and irrigation
  - (96.0) Nonoperative intubation of gastrointestinal and respiratory tracts
    - (96.01) Insertion of nasopharyngeal airway
    - (96.02) Insertion of oropharyngeal airway
    - (96.03) Insertion of esophageal obturator airway
    - (96.04) Insertion of endotracheal tube
    - (96.05) Other intubation of respiratory tract
    - (96.06) Insertion of Sengstaken tube
      - Esophageal tamponade
    - (96.07) Insertion of other (naso-)gastric tube
    - (96.08) Insertion of (naso-)intestinal tube
      - Miller-Abbott tube (for decompression)
    - (96.09) Insertion of rectal tube
  - (96.1) Other nonoperative insertion
  - (96.2) Nonoperative dilation and manipulation
  - (96.3) Nonoperative alimentary tract irrigation, cleaning, and local instillation
    - (96.31) Gastric cooling
    - (96.32) Gastric freezing
    - (96.33) Gastric lavage
    - (96.34) Other irrigation of (naso-)gastric tube
    - (96.35) Gastric gavage
    - (96.36) Irrigation of gastrostomy or enterostomy
    - (96.37) Proctoclysis
    - (96.38) Removal of impacted feces
  - (96.4) Nonoperative irrigation, cleaning, and local instillation of other digestive and genitourinary organs
    - (96.41) Irrigation of cholecystostomy and other biliary tube
    - (96.42) Irrigation of pancreatic tube
    - (96.43) Digestive tract instillation, except gastric gavage
    - (96.44) Vaginal douche
    - (96.45) Irrigation of nephrostomy and pyelostomy
    - (96.46) Irrigation of ureterostomy and ureteral catheter
    - (96.47) Irrigation of cystostomy
    - (96.48) Irrigation of other indwelling urinary catheter
    - (96.49) Other genitourinary instillation
  - (96.5) Other nonoperative irrigation and cleaning
  - (96.6) Enteral infusion of concentrated nutritional substances
  - (96.7) Other continuous invasive mechanical ventilation

=== Replacement and removal of therapeutic appliances/nonoperative removal of foreign body or calculus ===
- (97) Replacement and removal of therapeutic appliances
  - (97.0) Nonoperative replacement of gastrointestinal appliance
  - (97.1) Nonoperative replacement of musculoskeletal and integumentary system appliance
  - (97.2) Other nonoperative replacement
  - (97.3) Nonoperative removal of therapeutic device from head and neck
  - (97.4) Nonoperative removal of therapeutic device from thorax
  - (97.5) Nonoperative removal of therapeutic device from digestive system
  - (97.6) Nonoperative removal of therapeutic device from urinary system
  - (97.7) Nonoperative removal of therapeutic device from genital system
  - (97.8) Other nonoperative removal of therapeutic device
- (98) Nonoperative removal of foreign body or calculus
  - (98.0) Removal of intraluminal foreign body from digestive system without incision
  - (98.1) Removal of intraluminal foreign body from other sites without incision
  - (98.2) Removal of other foreign body without incision
  - (98.5) Extracorporeal shockwave lithotripsy (ESWL)

=== Other nonoperative procedures ===
- (99) Other nonoperative procedures
  - (99.0) Transfusion of blood and blood components
  - (99.1) Injection or infusion of therapeutic or prophylactic substance
  - (99.2) Injection or infusion of other therapeutic or prophylactic substance
    - (99.20) Injection or infusion of platelet inhibitor
    - (99.21) Injection of antibiotic
    - (99.22) Injection of other anti-infective
    - (99.23) Injection of steroid
    - (99.24) Injection of other hormone
    - (99.25) Injection or infusion of cancer chemotherapeutic substance
    - (99.26) Injection of tranquilizer
    - (99.27) Iontophoresis
    - (99.28) Injection or infusion of biological response modifier (BRM) as an antineoplastic agent
    - (99.29) Injection or infusion of other therapeutic or prophylactic substance
  - (99.3) Prophylactic vaccination and inoculation against certain bacterial diseases
  - (99.4) Prophylactic vaccination and inoculation against certain viral diseases
  - (99.5) Other vaccination and inoculation
  - (99.6) Conversion of cardiac rhythm
    - (99.60) Cardiopulmonary resuscitation, not otherwise specified
    - (99.61) Atrial cardioversion
    - (99.62) Other electric countershock of heart
    - (99.63) Closed chest cardiac massage
    - (99.64) Carotid sinus stimulation
    - (99.69) Other conversion of cardiac rhythm
  - (99.7) Therapeutic apheresis or other injection, administration, or infusion of other therapeutic or prophylactic substance
  - (99.8) Miscellaneous physical procedures
    - (99.81) Hypothermia (central) (local)
    - (99.82) Ultraviolet light therapy
    - (99.83) Other phototherapy
    - (99.84) Isolation
    - (99.85) Hyperthermia for treatment of cancer
    - (99.86) Non-invasive placement of bone growth stimulator
    - (99.88) Therapeutic photopheresis
  - (99.9) Other miscellaneous procedures

== See also ==
- ICD-10 Procedure Coding System
