= Bone removal =

Bone removal may refer to:

- Ostectomy
- Digital bone removal in volume rendering
