= Paolo Antonio Boccasanta =

Italian surgeon

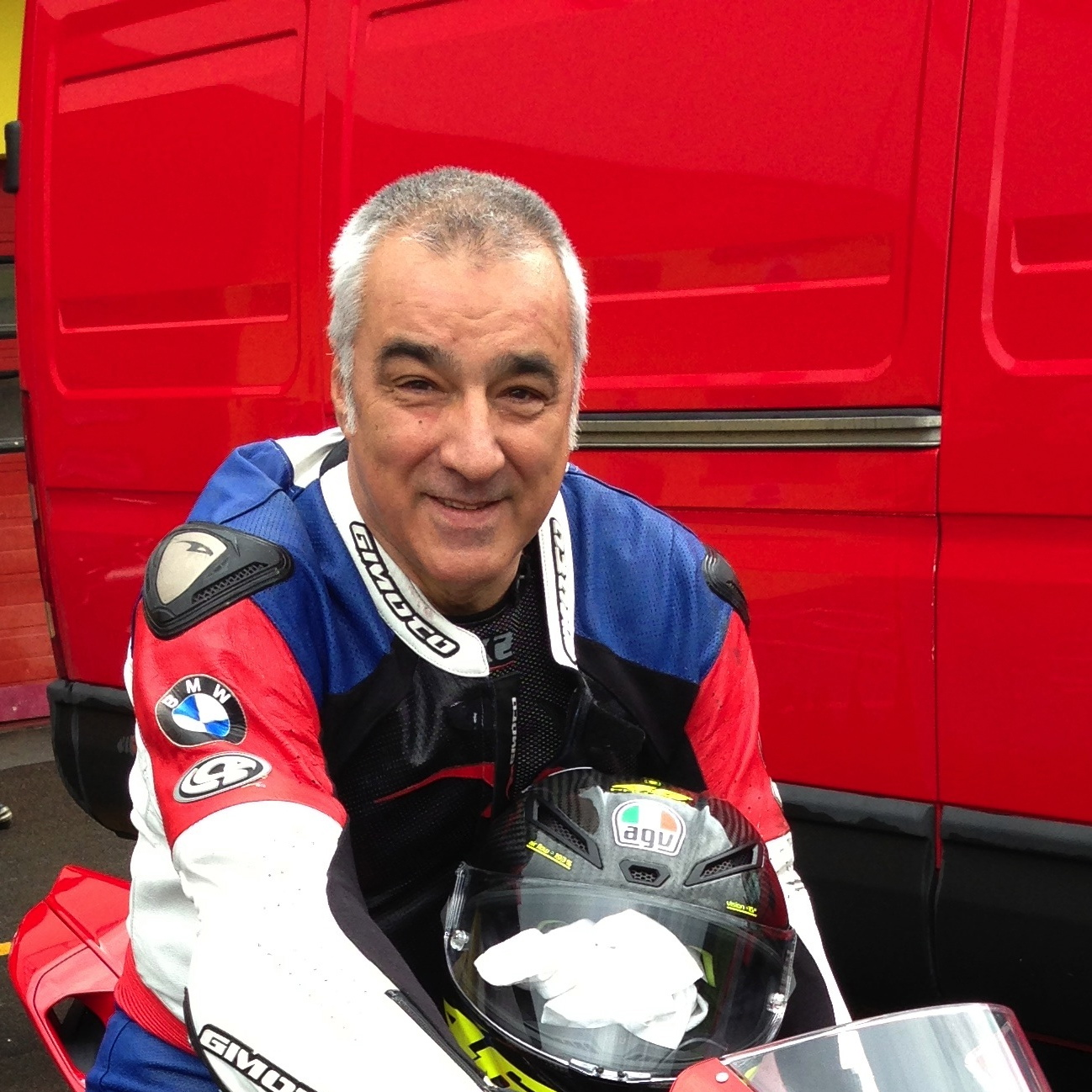
Paolo Boccasanta is an Italian surgeon, born on 13 June 1952, in Roncoferraro (MN)

Paolo Antonio Boccasanta is an Italian general surgeon, a professor at the University of Milan and a specialist in general, vascular and thoracic surgery. He took a qualification in Coloproctology in 2000 in Brighton (UK) from the European Board of Surgery.

== Early life and education ==
He was born in Roncoferraro (MN) on 13 June 1952.
After taking his high school diploma in 1971, he started studying medicine and surgery at the University of Milan. On 24 October 1977, he graduated with honours with a degree thesis on "the procedure of identification of gastric proteins".

In 1982, he took his specialization in general surgery at the University of Milan, with a degree thesis on "The results of thoracic gangliectomy on Raynaud".

On 5 November 1987, he took another specialization in vascular surgery and in 1994 in thoracic surgery at the University of Milan with a thesis on the "Thoracoscopic dissection of the esophagus: experimental study and clinical use perspectives". He passed his qualifying examination and became Chief of General Surgery with a 99/100 mark at the Ministry of Health – management of hospitals – effective date 6 July 1988. He took a qualification in Coloproctology on 9 July 2000 in Brighton (UK) from the European Board of Surgery.

== Didactic career ==
After his graduation, from 1977 to 1980, Paolo Boccasanta attended, as an intern and later as a scholarship holder, the "III Institute of Surgical Clinic" of the University of Milan directed by Prof. Walter Montorsi and he collaborated to the preparation of the lessons and he supervised the exercises of 5th and 6th year students of the first degree course in Medicine and Surgery.

From the academic year 1981/1982 to the academic year 1988/1989, he taught at the "Scuola S. Camillo" in the "Casa di cura S. Pio X" in Milan.

From 1981 to 1992, first as a surgical assistant (SA) and then as a jointly responsible surgical assistance, he conducted many internships – such as convalescence ward, specialist clinics, operating room (OR)-to students and apprentices at the Surgical Clinic Institute III of the University of Milan, directed by Prof. Walter Montorsi.

He contributed in the outlining of a number of dissertations for degree candidates in Medicine and for residents in the digestive system surgery and the digestive surgical endoscopy.

From 1992 to 2002, under professor Peracchia's direction, he gave classes to the students of the 5th and 6th year's laurea degree course in Medicine and Surgery in the clinical environment of coloproctology.

From the academic year 1990 to 2001, he was Professor on contract teaching "New techniques of functional evaluation and therapy of the colorectal-anal pathology" as integration of the General Surgery course at the 1st Postgraduate school of Digestive System and Surgical Digestive Endoscopy at the University of Milan directed by Prof. Walter Montorsi and later by Prof. Alberto Peracchia.

In the academic year 2001–2002 he continued teaching at the Postgraduate school of General Surgery and he collaborated with Prof. Alberto Peracchia in his classes for the 2nd and 3rd year residents.
In the tutorial activity of the Postgraduate school of General Surgery he developed a practical activity of sustain and improvement in the external surgical wards agreed upon with the school itself.

For the academic year 2003–2004 he was reconfirmed with the same functions by Prof. Emilio Trabucchi, the new Director of the Postgraduate school of General Surgery.

From 2005 to 2006 until now he was a Professor on contract (teaching assignment free of charge) to conduct educational and technical activities to the "Surgical Clinic and surgical therapy" course at the Faculty of Medicine and Surgery of the University of Milan.

== Scientific career ==
His scientific activity was firstly addressed to the Vascular Diagnostics non-invasive, especially to the use of Continuous wave Doppler Velocimetry in Vascular Pathology, and he published several scientific works both in Italian and foreign languages.

Lately he directed his interest to colorectal-anal pathologies, after Prof. Walter Montorsi addressed him, and he attended the most important centres of colorectal surgery in France. He published a lot of scientific works and they certify his continuous clinical research in coloproctology field.
From 1989, Boccasanta focused his clinical and scientific activity in the medical-surgical diagnosis and therapy of the complex disorder of the pelvic static with a particular reference to the surgical treatment of the rectal prolapse. He took a master-class at the "Service de Chirurgie Digestive" of the "Hopital Saint Antoine" in Paris directed by Prof. Roland Parc and at the "Service de Chirurgie Digestive" of the "Clinique Saint Roch" in Montpellier directed by Dr. Guy Costalat.
In 1993, he was responsible for a research for the "Ospedale Maggiore Policlinico" in Milan titled "Modello sperimentale nel maiale: rettopessi con rete di mersilene al promontorio per via laparoscopica" and for another research titled "Indicazioni e limiti al trattamento endoscopico nella patologia ano-rettale nei confronti della chirurgia ambulatoriale".
In 1994, he was responsible for a research titled "Rettopessi per via laparoscopica nel prolasso rettale: trasferimento della metodica sperimentale alla pratica clinica".
Boccasanta actually contributed to the introduction in Italy of the execution of rectopexy and of the resection rectopexy via laparoscopic mini invasive in the rectal prolapse, proved by his surgical interventions, his scientific publications in very important Italian and foreign magazines and proved by his videos shown everywhere successfully.
He was the first surgeon in Italy introducing the execution of the "Proctosigmoidectomia per via perineale sec. Altemeier con perineoplastica totale" in ancient patients affected by complete rectal prolapse and in 1997 he won the 1st award for best communication on the "rectal prolapse" topic presented at the 4th National Congress UCP Club in Modena. His résumé in this field was enriched in 1997, when he took his University Diploma at the Faculty of Medicine in Strasbourg (France) in "Laparoscopic visceral surgery".

In the same year he also attended a European master-class in laparoscopic colorectal surgery in Bordeaux (France) and the advanced course in laparoscopic colorectal surgery in Strasbourg at the European Institute of Telesurgery.

In 1997 with his promoter, he started the "Camillo Corti foundation for research on colon pathologies" and it was authorized by the Ministry of Health and he became vice-president of the foundation by promoting some National Congresses on the topic, particularly the 1st International congress on "the rectal prolapse surgery in early 2000", venue in Milan on 1 October 1998 in which he had the function of scientific secretary. In 1998 he took part of the new edition of the "Advanced Course in Laparoscopic Colorectal Surgery" of the EITS of Strasbourg.

== Merits ==
- Since 1998 he's a member of the UCP Club Governing Council and Secretary of the VI Commission "Protocolli terapeutici e trial" of the Italian Association of Coloproctology Unit.
- He was selected from the best five abstracts for the "Grassi Price" at the Collegium Internationale Chirurgie Digestive that took place in Madrid (Spain) on the 16th -19 September 1998 with the title "Laparotomic vs Laparoscopic Rectopexy in Complete Rectal Prolapse" and fully published on the Digestive Surgery Magazine.
- From 10 May 1999 to 25 June 1999 Postgraduate Teaching Terms at St Mark's Hospital (London).
- He is qualified in Coloproctology on 9 July 2000 in Brighton (UK) from the European Board of Surgery.
- Winner in joint place of the Prize raffled by Intesa Sanpaolo for the best oral communication "Italian UCP experience in the surgical treatment of symptomatic rectocele" presented to the Joint Congress SICP - UCP that took place in Verona from 19th to 23rd Seteptember 2000.

== Responsibilities ==
- He's an organizer since 2000 of the "UCP MILANO 6 - Istituto Clinico Euromedica" validated by the Italian United Society of Coloproctology and located in Milan.
- In 2000 he was a member of the Editorial Committee of the international magazine " Techniques in Coloproctology".
- Since 2003 he's a member of the Steering Committee of the Unitary Italian Society of Colonproctology (S.I.UC.P) and Secretary of the Commission "Multicultural studies, Trials and Guide lines".
- Vice-President of the Unitary Italian Society of ColonProctology (S.I.UC.P)for 2005–2007.
- Reviewer since 2004 of the Indian Journal of Surgery.
- Reviewer in 2005 of the British Journal of Surgery.
- Author of 195 scientific work for publishing (54 in English).
- 92 scientific publications in extenso (30 in English) and 103 in abstract (24 in English).
- He took part of 140 scientific congresses (30 of them international) as speaker, moderator and he made surgical operations live.
