= Roncoferraro =

Roncoferraro Roncafrèr (Emilian)
- Comune
- Comune di Roncoferraro
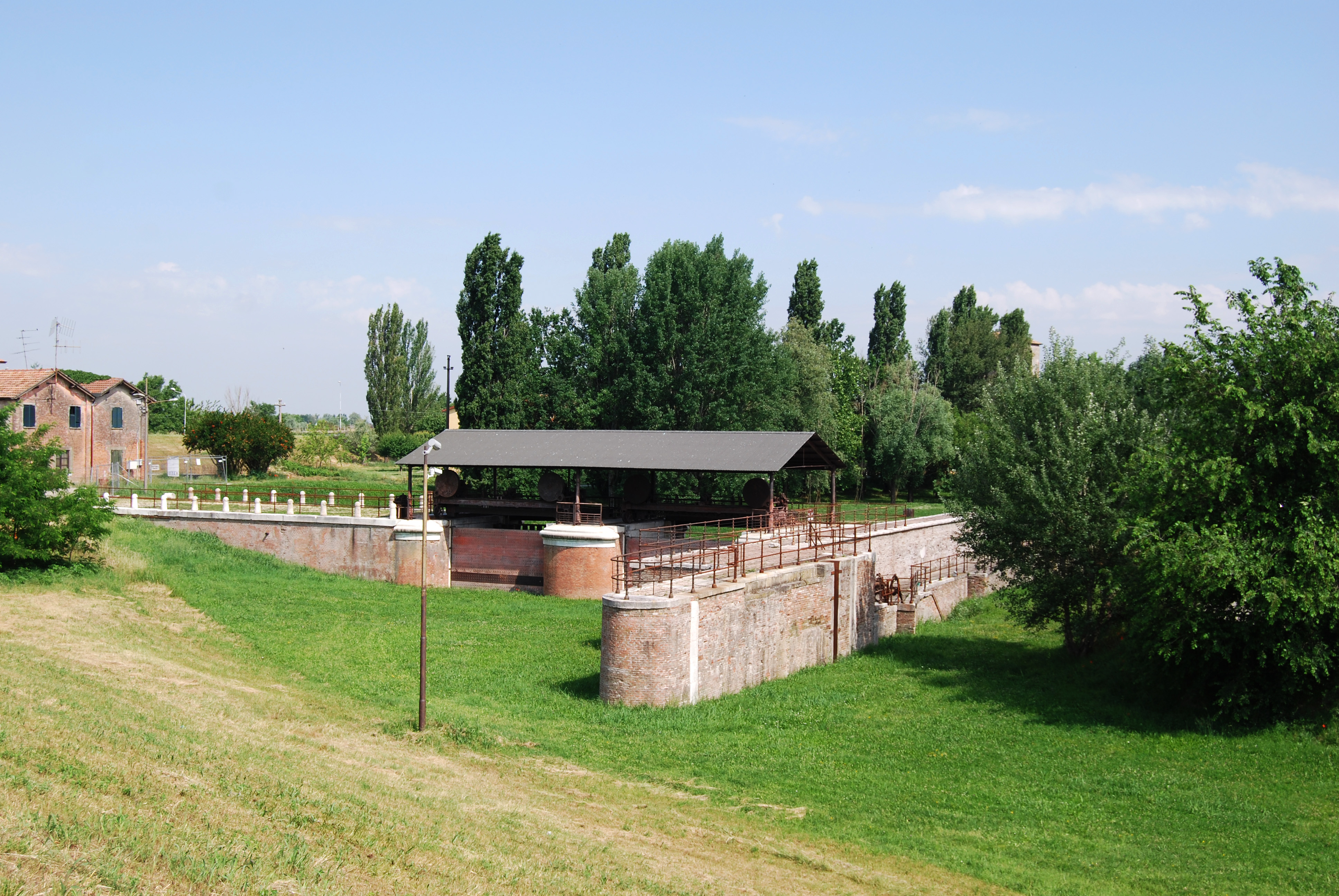
- Conca of St. Leo I in Governolo.

- Coat of arms

- Location within Italy Location within Lombardy
- Coordinates: 45°5′N 10°53′E
- Country: Italy
- Region: Lombardy
- Province: Mantua (MN)
- Frazioni: Governolo, Casale, Nosedole, Barbasso, Barbassolo, Villa Garibaldi, Garolda, Pontemerlano, Castelletto Borgo, Cadè

Government
  - Mayor: Federico Baruffaldi

Area
  - Total: 63.43 km^{2} (24.49 sq mi)
- Elevation: 25 m (82 ft)

Population (31 July 2014)
  - Total: 712,829
  - Density: 11,240/km^{2} (29,110/sq mi)
- Demonym: Roncoferraresi
- Time zone: UTC+1 (CET)
  - Summer (DST): UTC+2 (CEST)
- Postal code: 46037
- Dialing code: 0376
- Patron saint: St. John
- Website: Official website

Roncoferraro (Mantovano: Roncafrèr) is a comune (municipality) in the Province of Mantua in the Italian region of Lombardy, located about 140 kilometres (87 mi) southeast of Milan and about 11 kilometres (7 mi) southeast of Mantua.

Roncoferraro borders the following municipalities: Bagnolo San Vito, Bigarello, Castel d'Ario, Mantua, San Giorgio di Mantova, Sustinente, Villimpenta.

== History ==
According to the tradition, the frazione of Governolo was the seat of the meeting between Pope Leo I and Attila in 452. Also in Governolo the condottiero Giovanni dalle Bande Nere was shot by a cannonball in 1526, later dying out of the wounds received.

During the Italian Wars of Independence, Governolo, due to its strategically important bridge over the Mincio River, was the location of two battles:

- The first (April 24, 1848) allowed the small Modenese army to push back an Austrian inroad against the fortress of Mantua.
- In the second (July 18, 1848) the Piedmontese general Eusebio Bava conquered back the bridge.

== Notable people ==
- Paolo Antonio Boccasanta, Italian general surgeon, university professor, and surgery specialist.
