= Psychiatric somatotherapy =

Soma (body) based psychotherapy and psychiatric treatments

- ICD-10-PCS: GZC-GZH
- ICD-9-CM: 94.2
- MeSH: D013000

Psychiatric somatotherapy (or somatic therapy) is the treatment of mental illness by physical means (such as medication, electroconvulsive therapy, or psychosurgery) rather than psychotherapy.

== See also ==
- Lobotomy
- Straitjacket
- Joseph Mason Cox – introduced a psychiatric somatotherapic treatment called Swinging
