= William Osler Abbott =

American physician (1902–1943)

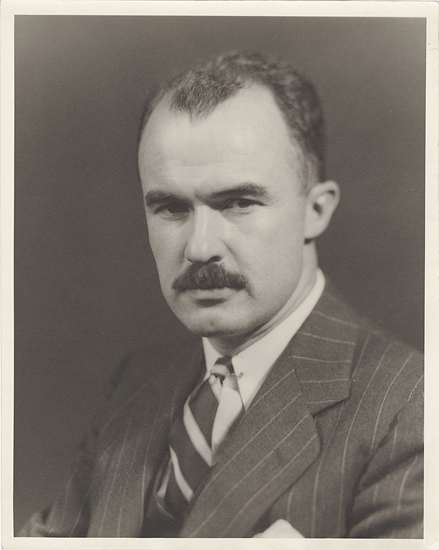
- Abbott in 1922
- Born: 26 July 1902; New Bedford, Massachusetts, United States
- Died: 10 September 1943 (aged 41)
- Education: University of Pennsylvania
- Known for: Miller-Abbott tube, Abbott Rawson tube
- Scientific career
- Fields: Medicine

William Osler Abbott (1902–1943) was a United States physician, son of Alexander C. Abbott and Georgina Osler. His most notable contribution to the field of medicine was his part in the development of the Miller-Abbott tube, used in decompression and stenting of the small intestine, alongside Thomas Grier Miller, and also for devising the Abbot Rawson tube. Abbot received his MD in 1928 from the University of Pennsylvania. He died of myelogenous leukemia in Waquoit, Massachusetts on September 10, 1943.

== Personal life ==
William Osler Abbott was born July 26, 1902, in New Bedford, Massachusetts. He was given the nickname "Pete" growing up. His father, Alexander Abbott, was a member of the resident staff at Johns Hopkins Hospital and his mother, Georgina Osler, was a niece of William Osler. His parents met while his mother was taking care of Osler's home in Baltimore. His family would vacation at Waquoit a lot in the summers, which is where he came to love everything about the sea. At just the young age of 10, Abbott would skin the fish in jars of water and put the bones and cartilage together with fine wire and when he was only 15, he could sail 30 miles at night from Waquoit to Nantucket. William Osler Abbott married a young lady from Kansas City named Lucy Waldo in 1928. The newly married Abbotts spent their honeymoon in an open dory sailing among Cape Cod's Elizabeth Islands. They had three children, Thomas William Osler, Ann Gatewood, and Lucy Featherstone.

== Career ==
William Osler Abbott received his A.B. in 1925 and M.D. in 1928 from the University of Pennsylvania. After graduating he worked as an intern in a Hospital of the University of Pennsylvania. From 1931 to 1934 he had experience working part-time with the Department of Pharmacology, and he also co-founded the Miller Abbott Tube in 1934, which is a double lumen drainage intestinal tube for relief of distention. His partner was T. Grier Miller who worked with him from 1930 to 1934 when they founded the Miller Abbott Tube. In the midst of being part-time with the Department of Pharmacology, Abbott was working his way up the ladder at Penn. He Joined the Gastro Intestinal clinic at Penn and was first recognized as a Medical fellow from 1930 to 1931. From 1931 to 1937 he was known as an instructor at University of Pennsylvania. In the year 1937, Abbott worked with a man named Arthur Joy Rawson creating the Abbott Rawson Tube, which is a double barreled Gastroenterostomy tube for use in postoperative care. From an instructor he was now named associate from the year 1937 to 1941. Abbott was known as a professor of medicine at Penn, however the following year he brought his expertise to the U.S. Army. When Abbott joined the U.S. Army he was already the rank of a major. Shortly, being discharged due to his diagnosis of leukemia. After fabricating his double lumen tube, Abbott would initially swallow the tube in the morning at his home on the Main Line outside of Philadelphia, ride to work on the train with the proximal end exiting his nose and curled around his ear or leaving his mouth beside a pipe and residing in a coat pocket. Once in the hospital the intubation continued under fluoroscopic guidance. With the fundamentals of a practical technique of intubation established, he began his investigations of the absorptive capacity of the gut and the effect of drugs on the intestine in December 1932. On May 15, 1942, Abbott, a major in the United States Army Medical Corps, left Philadelphia with the 20th General Hospital for Camp Claiborne, Louisiana. Eight days later while undergoing a physical examination a large spleen was detected and blood studies led to a diagnosis of Myelogenous leukemia. Abbott's remaining months of life were spent researching his cancerous disease.

== Miller–Abbott tube ==
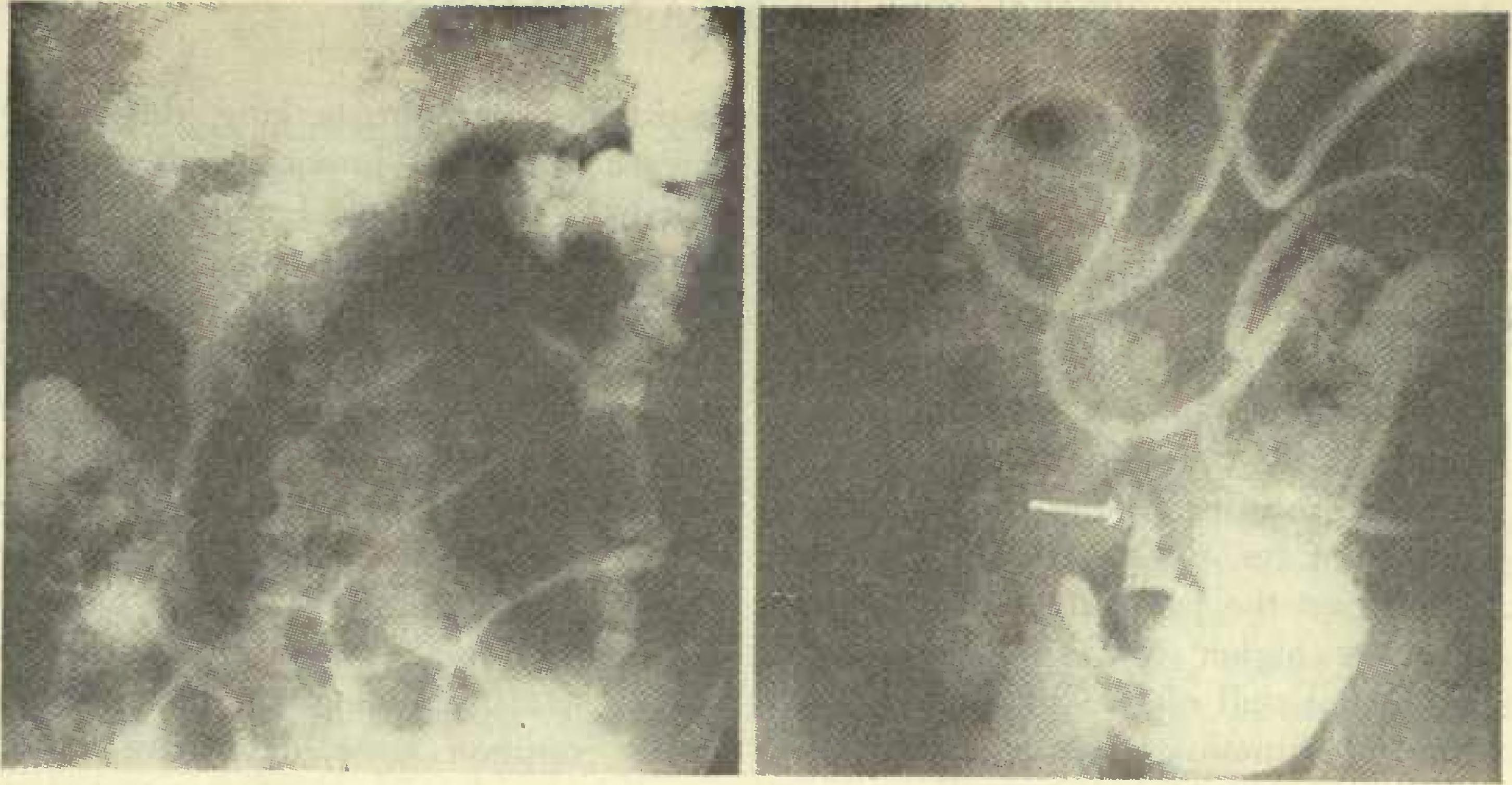
Miller Abbott Tube (Miller Abbott double lumen tube)

The Miller–Abbott tube was introduced in 1934 and was used to sample gastrointestinal fluid. It helps with diagnosing and treating by compressing the obstructive matter found in the small intestine. This roughly 3 meter (9.8 feet long) double-channel intestinal tube is with an inflatable balloon at its distal end, is used for diagnosing and treating obstructive lesions of the small intestine. The tube is inserted via a nostril and gently passed through the stomach and into the small intestine. Still largely unchanged in 2011, once this instrument weaves down the esophagus and into the stomach, the tube is capable of a handful of jobs at this point, from suctioning gastric juices for testing and irrigation to ballooning open the entryway to the small intestine, called the duodenum, for clearer radiology testing and easier removal of many intestinal blockages. The Miller-Abbott tube is named after American gastroenterologists William Osler Abbott and Thomas Grier Miller. These doctors also pioneered the surgical procedures that set the stage for easier diagnosis and removal of stomach and intestinal lesions, blockages and ulcers. With the instrument having its double-barreled design, one of the pipes, called a lumen, is responsible for pumping up a thin balloon at the tip for easy exploration into the intestines at the duodenum. The other lumen tube can then suction fluids out or pump fluids in, depending on the procedure. For radiology, a barium solution can be pumped into the duodenum to isolate potential damage and produce clear images of it. Allowing the tube to proceed into the intestines also might help dislodge identified blockages causing pain or digestive disorders. In 2011, the Miller-Abbott tube might be accompanied by another, called a laparoscope. This latter tube combines a light and camera to give physicians a three-dimensional, colored view of whatever blockage is occurring. It can also help the doctor know exactly when the Miller-Abbott tube's balloon is at the perfect location in the duodenum — a process that depends on the slow and steady peristaltic contractions of the digestive tract.

== Abbott–Rawson Tube ==
In 1937 Abbott helped create a new instrument for gastrointestinal surgery called the Abbott–Rawson tube. The tube may be used for Jejunal feedings and for administrating potassium, antibiotics or vitamins. Although many uses beyond that for which it was first employed have been developed, it remains a much neglected surgical adjunct. For a time after it was described in 1937, the device was widely used for the emptying of the gastrointestinal tract at times of surgical stress. Now it is described in only one textbook on surgery.

== Thomas Grier Miller ==
William Osler Abbott did not create the Miller Abbott tube all alone, he had significant help from his coworker and good friend Thomas Grier Miller, who was an American internist. Miller was born on September 18, 1886, in Satesville, North Carolina. He received an A.B. from the University of North Carolina in 1906 and graduated in medicine from the University of Pennsylvania in 1911 and then commenced clinical investigation in the department of medicine, but this was interrupted by the 1st World War where he served in the army as a captain. Just like Abbott, Miller also accomplished many achievements throughout his career. In 1926, Miller founded the Gastro Intestinal Section of the Medical Clinic at the Hospital of the University of Pennsylvania and was chief of the section from 1928 until his retirement in 1952. From 1913 to 1952, he also held posts in the School of Medicine at the University, becoming professor of clinical medicine in 1934. Miller published on many areas of medicine, but concentrated mainly on gastroenterology and in 1934 commenced a series of papers with William Osler Abbott and W. G. Carr on intubation and studies of the small intestine which became classics and were made possible by the invention of the double lumen tube. This arose when Abbott was unable to keep a tube with one distended balloon at a fixed point of the duodenum and Miller suggested that a second open tube be tied to the bag to see if this would make sampling easier. Miller later went on to die on November 15, 1981, Hospital of the University of Pennsylvania.

== Death ==
In September of May 1942, Abbott was honorably discharged from the army because of a physical disability and died of myelogenous leukemia. Abbott spent the remaining months before he died doing leukemia research. It is believed this happened following the excess X-ray exposure he received in screening the position of the tube in volunteers and patients he was investigating.

== Years after death ==
A small 5 series collection about William Osler Abbott was assembled by Catharine G. Leeke, his secretary at the Gastro Intestinal Clinic at the Hospital of the University of Pennsylvania. It contains personal information, a summary of his professional work, and information on his final years. On June 7, 1972, the collection was donated by Thomas A. Urbine, Jr. on behalf of Catharine Leeke to the Historical Society of Pennsylvania and then transferred to the College of Physicians.

== Bibliography ==
- "Miller Abbott Tube" Medical Dictionary.thefreedictionary.com. Web. 25 March 2016
- Abbott, W. Osler, Socialarchive.iath.virginia.edu, 2014. Web. March 14, 2016
- Harkins, Dan, and Kaci Lane Hindman. WiseGeek. Conjecture. Web. 04 Apr. 2016.
- "W. Osler Abbott Papers, 1938-1949". Historical Medical Library of the College of Physicians of Philadelphia. March 17, 2016.
- Odou, Bruce L., and Eugene R. Odou. "THE USE OF THE ABBOTT-RAWSON TUBE." California Medicine. U.S. National Library of Medicine, 1949. Web. 04 Apr. 2016.
- Schnabel, T. G. "William Osler Abbott: His Double Lumen Tube." Transactions of the American Clinical and Climatological Association. American Clinical and Climatological Association, 2001. Web. 17 Mar. 2016.
- "Thomas Grier Miller". Whonamedit. Archived from the original on March 2, 2002.
- Unbound MEDLINE : William Osler Abbott: His Double Lumen Tub." Unbound MEDLINE : William Osler Abbott: His Double Lumen Tub. Web. 18 Mar. 2016.
- W. OSLER ABBOTT, Collegeofphysicians.org, 2002. Web. March 14, 2016
- William Osler Abbott: His Double Lumen Tube." ResearchGate. Web. 16 Mar. 2016.
- "William Osler Abbott". Who named it. 2016. Archived from the original on March 5, 2002.
