= Ventricular aneurysm =

Aneurysm of heart
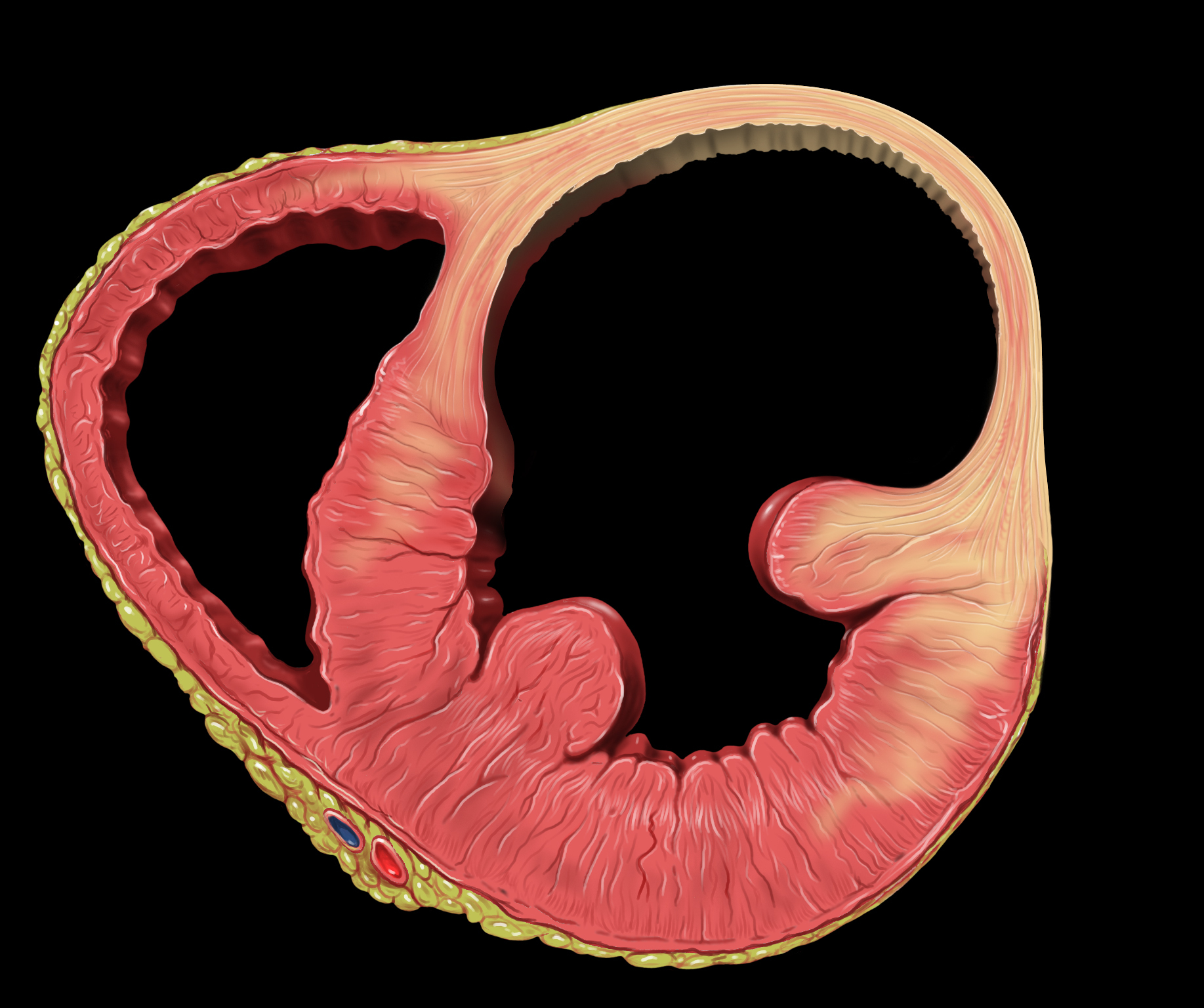
- Heart left ventricular aneurysm short axis view

Ventricular aneurysms are one of the many complications that may occur after a heart attack. The word aneurysm refers to a bulge or 'pocketing' of the wall or lining of a vessel commonly occurring in the blood vessels at the base of the septum, or within the aorta. In the heart, they usually arise from a patch of weakened tissue in a ventricular wall, which swells into a bubble filled with blood. This, in turn, may block the passageways leading out of the heart, leading to severely constricted blood flow to the body. Ventricular aneurysms can be fatal. They are usually non-rupturing because they are lined by scar tissue.

A left ventricular aneurysm can be associated with ST elevation.

== Signs and symptoms ==
Ventricular aneurysms usually grow at a very slow pace, but can still pose problems. Usually, this type of aneurysm grows in the left ventricle. This bubble has the potential to block blood flow to the rest of the body, and thus limit the patient's stamina. In other cases, a similarly developed pseudoaneurysm ("false aneurysm") may burst, sometimes resulting in the death of the patient. Also, blood clots may form on the inside of ventricular aneurysms, and form embolisms. If such a clot escapes from the aneurysm, it will be moved in the circulation throughout the body. If it gets stuck inside a blood vessel, it may cause ischemia in a limb, a painful condition that can lead to reduced movement and tissue death in the limb. Alternatively, if a clot blocks a vessel going to the brain, it can cause a stroke. In certain cases, ventricular aneurysms cause ventricular failure or arrhythmia. At this stage, treatment is necessary.

== Causes ==
Ventricular aneurysms are usually complications resulting from a heart attack. When the heart muscle (cardiac muscle) partially dies during a heart attack, a layer of muscle may survive, and, being severely weakened, start to become an aneurysm. Blood may flow into the surrounding dead muscle and inflate the weakened flap of muscle into a bubble. It may also be congenital.

== Diagnosis ==
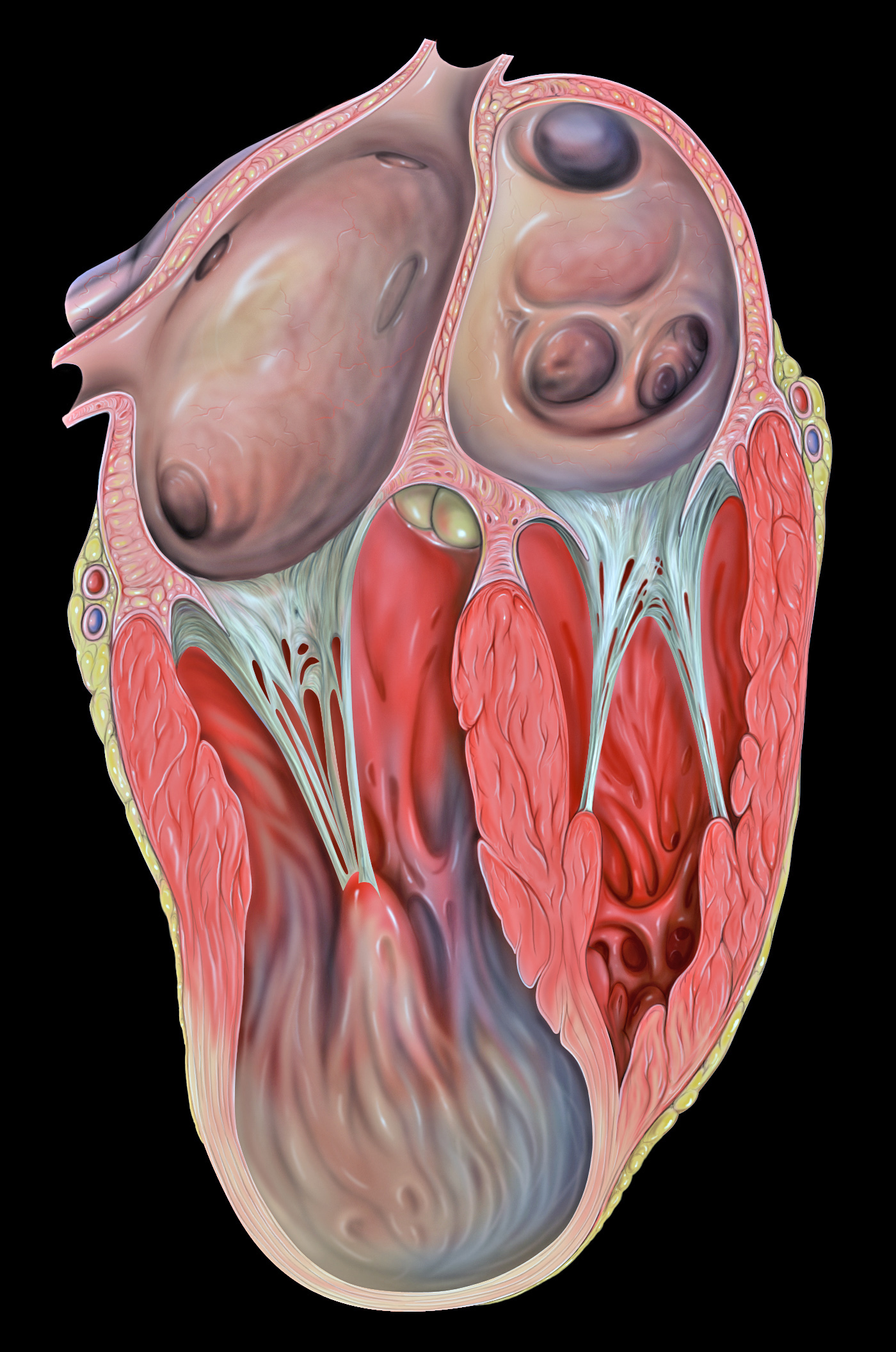
Left ventricular aneurysm

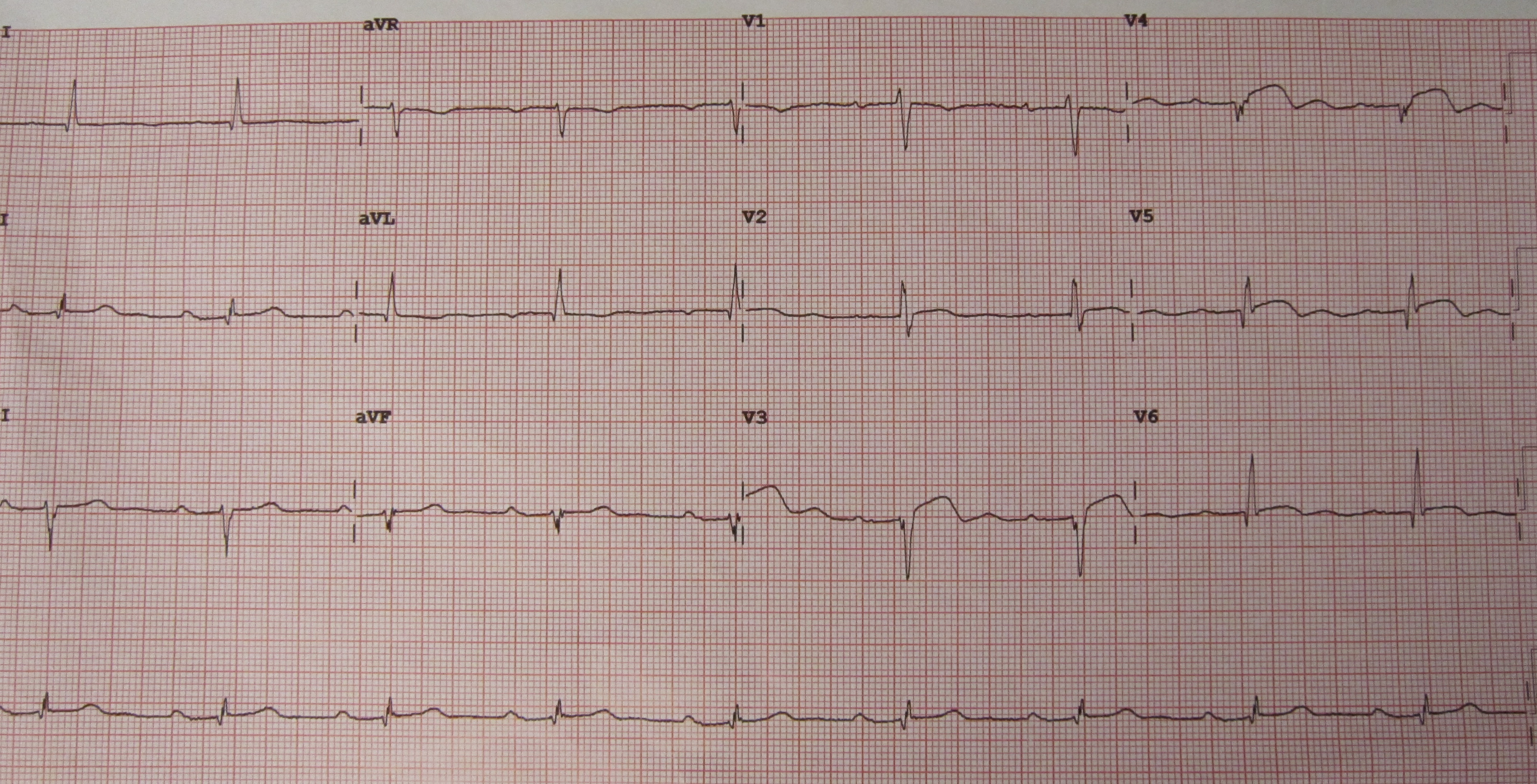
An ECG of a person with a left ventricular aneurysm. Note the ST elevation in the anterior leads.

When a person visits the hospital or doctor with other symptoms, especially with a history of heart problems, they will normally be required to undergo an electrocardiogram, which monitors electrical activity within the heart and shows abnormalities when a cardiac aneurysm is present. It can also appear as a bulge on a chest x-ray, and a more accurate diagnosis will then be made using an echocardiogram, which uses ultrasound to 'photograph' the heart and how it functions while it beats.

Left ventricular aneurysm as seen on ultrasound

Left ventricular aneurysm as seen on ultrasound

=== Differential diagnosis ===
It should also not be confused with a pseudoaneurysm, coronary artery aneurysm or a myocardial rupture (which involves a hole in the wall, not just a bulge.)

=== Cardiac Diverticulum ===
Cardiac diverticulum or ventricular diverticulum is defined as a congenital malformation of the fibrous or muscular part of the heart which is only visible during chest x-rays or during an echocardiogram reading. This should not be confused with ventricular diverticulum, as the latter is a sub type derived from the latter in congenital cases. it is usually asymptomatic and is only detected using imaging. Fibrous diverticulum is characterised by a calcification if present at the tip ( apex) or a thrombi that may detaches to form an emboli. Muscular diverticulum is characterised by appendix forming at the ether of the ventricles. it is a rare anomaly and can be diagnosed prenatal. Diagnosis is usually done by a chest X-ray and silhouette is viewed around the heart. Echocardiogram reading present a similar picture to ventricular aneurysms on the ST segment. Management is dependent on the situation presented and the severity of the case. Usually, surgical resection is advised but in prenatal cases, due to combination with other cardiac abnormalities, especially in latter trimesters, but pericardiocentesis is useful technique to reduce pleural effusion or/ and secondary disorders.

== Treatment ==
Some people live with this type of aneurysm for many years without any specific treatment. Treatment is limited to surgery (ventricular reduction) for this defect of the heart. However, surgery is not required in most cases but, limiting the patient's physical activity levels to lower the risk of making the aneurysm bigger is advised. Also, ACE Inhibitors seem to prevent Left Ventricular remodeling and aneurysm formation.

Blood thinning agents may be given to help reduce the likelihood of blood thickening and clots forming, along with the use of drugs to correct the irregular rhythm of the heart (seen on the electrocardiogram)

== See also ==
- Coronary artery aneurysm
