= Wechsler Memory Scale =

- ICD-9-CM: 94.02

The Wechsler Memory Scale (WMS) is a neuropsychological test designed to measure different memory functions in a person. Anyone ages 16 to 90 is eligible to take this test. The current version is the fourth edition (WMS-IV) which was published in 2009 and which was designed to be used with the WAIS-IV. A person's performance is reported as five Index Scores: Auditory Memory, Visual Memory, Visual Working Memory, Immediate Memory, and Delayed Memory. The WMS-IV also incorporates an optional cognitive exam (Brief Cognitive Status Exam) that helps to assess global cognitive functioning in people with suspected memory deficits or those who have been diagnosed with a various neural, psychiatric and/or developmental disorders. This may include conditions such as dementias or mild learning difficulties.

There is clear evidence that the WMS differentiates clinical groups (such as those with dementias or neurological disorders) from those with normal memory functioning and that the primary index scores can distinguish among the memory-impaired clinical groups.

== History ==
The original WMS was published by The Psychological Corporation (later acquired by Pearson), first in 1945, with revisions in 1987, 1997, and 2009. In late 2024, Pearson announced that it would be releasing a fifth revision of the scale in 2025.

The WMS-IV was normed with the WAIS-IV in the United States. This resulted in a representative normative sample of 1,400 adults (between the ages of 16 and 90) who completed both scales.
