= Bigarello =

Bigarello Bigarel (Emilian)
- Comune
- Comune di Bigarello
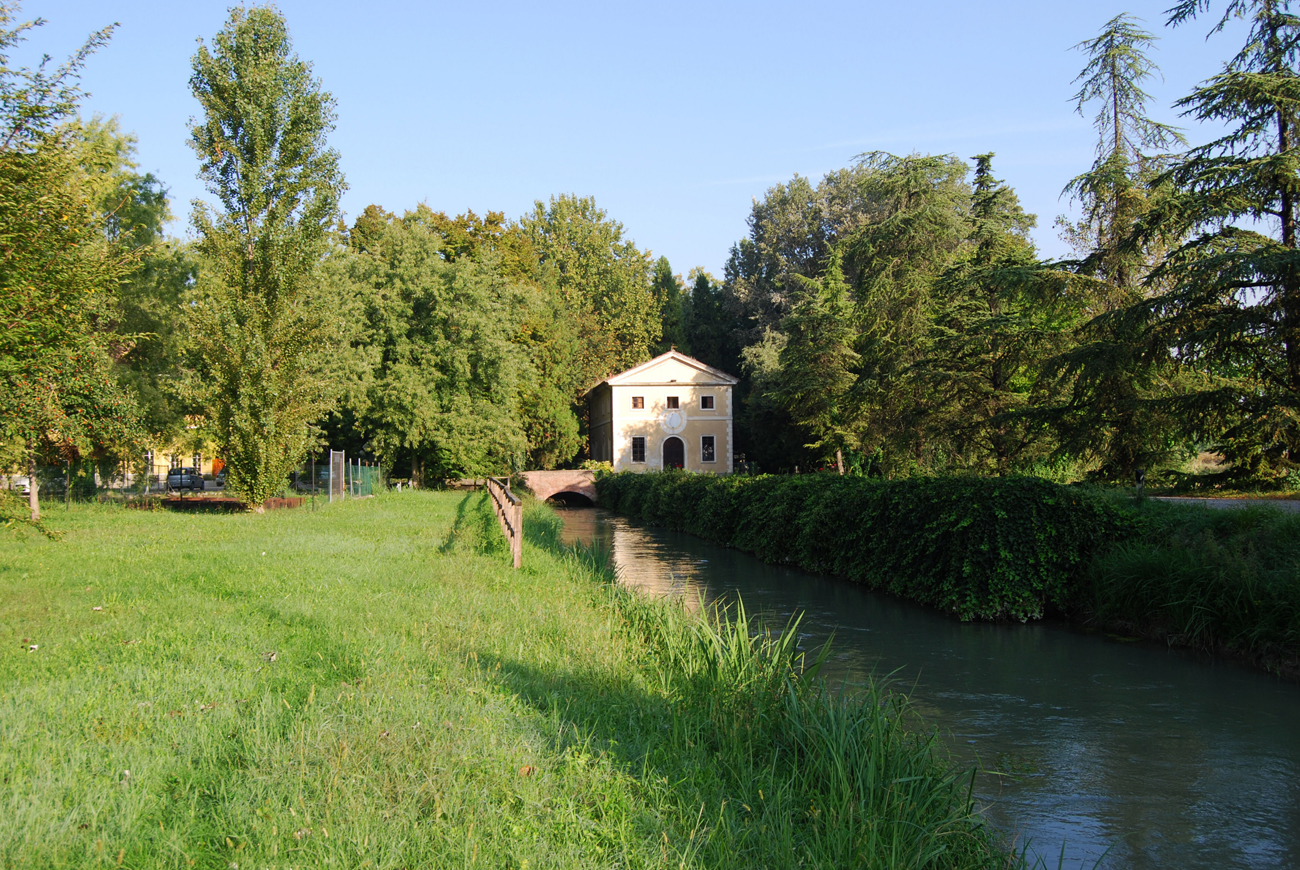
- View of Bigarello

- Location within Italy Location within Lombardy
- Coordinates: 45°11′N 10°54′E
- Country: Italy
- Region: Lombardy
- Province: Province of Mantua (MN)
- Frazioni: Bazza, Gazzo, Stradella

Area
  - Total: 27.0 km^{2} (10.4 sq mi)

Population (Dec. 2004)
  - Total: 1,850
  - Density: 68.5/km^{2} (177/sq mi)
- Time zone: UTC+1 (CET)
  - Summer (DST): UTC+2 (CEST)
- Postal code: 46030
- Dialing code: 0376
- Website: Official website

Bigarello (Mantovano: Bigarel) is a former comune (municipality) in the Province of Mantua in the Italian region Lombardy, located about 140 kilometres (87 mi) east of Milan and about 8 kilometres (5 mi) east of Mantua. As of 31 December 2004, it had a population of 1,850 and an area of 27.0 square kilometres (10.4 mi^{2}).

In January 2019 Bigarello merged with San Giorgio di Mantova to form the comune of San Giorgio Bigarello.

== Geography ==
The municipality contains the frazioni (subdivisions, mainly villages and hamlets) of Bazza, Gazzo (municipal seat) and Stradella.

Bigarello borders the following municipalities: Castel d'Ario, Castelbelforte, Roncoferraro, San Giorgio di Mantova, Sorgà.

== Demographic evolution ==
Historical population

Year	Pop.	±%
1861	?	—
1871	1,588	—
1881	1,748	+10.1%
1901	1,898	+8.6%
1911	2,123	+11.9%

Year	Pop.	±%
1921	2,429	+14.4%
1931	2,355	−3.0%
1936	2,397	+1.8%
1951	2,933	+22.4%
1961	2,208	−24.7%

Year	Pop.	±%
1971	1,663	−24.7%
1981	1,788	+7.5%
1991	1,712	−4.3%
2001	1,629	−4.8%

Source: Data from ISTAT

== See also ==
- Giuseppe De Luigi, artist born in Bigarello
