= Enterostomy =

Procedure to create opening in abdomen into the intestine

An enterostomy (entero- + -stomy; /ɛntəˈrɒstoʊmi/) is either (1) a surgical procedure to create a durable opening (called a stoma) through the abdominal wall into an intestine (small intestine or large intestine) or (2) the stoma thus created. The various types of enterostomy are named according to which intestinal segment is involved.

Enterostomy type	Intestinal segment
duodenostomy	duodenum
jejunostomy	jejunum
ileostomy	ileum
cecostomy	cecum
appendicostomy	appendix
colostomy	colon

Indications for surgery and complications are dependent on the site of the enterostomy.

Gastrostomies and enterostomies can be used to provide nutrition in digestive disorders.

Hernia development at both permanent and temporary enterostomy sites in a common complication.

== See also ==
- Gastrostomy
