= Giuseppe De Luigi =

Italian painter and sculptor (1908–1982)

Giuseppe De Luigi (4 October 1908 – 8 February 1982) was an Italian painter and sculptor. He drew his inspiration from a clever use of light and colours.

== Life ==
Giuseppe De Luigi was born on 4 October 1908 in Bigarello.

From his childhood, he shows a particular aptitude for drawing, he early tests his skill for watercolour, oil painting, wax and plaster sculptures.

In 1924 he attended Palazzo Ducale in Mantua where he studies the masterpieces of those great artists who operated there in the past, above all Andrea Mantegna, Giulio Romano. He learns the technique of fresco under the direction of important restorers.

From 1926 to 1930 he wins scholarships of the town-council of Bigarello and of the Institute Giuseppe Franchetti; in this way, he can follow painting courses in Florence. At Fiesole, he learns the art of pottery in a workshop. At famous "Caffè Giubbe Rosse", a cafè in Florence where the Italian Futurist movement (Futurismo) blossomed, he met artists and intellectuals as Ardengo Soffici, Giovanni Papini e Piero Bargellini.

Coming back to Mantua, he begins his artistic life. In 1931 he exhibited two works at the "Prima Mostra Provinciale d’Arte"; in 1932 he is mentioned in the volume "Artisti" edited by "Libreria del Milione" 1932-XI, together with Manzù, Tomea, Sassu, Lorenzetti, Giorgi. In 1936 he opens a studio with the sculptor A. Seguri in Bellalancia Street.

In 1938, he marries Giulia Danesi and they have four children.

In 1943, the war forces the young family to move to Castel Goffredo. Later, in 1952, they come to Milan. De Luigi takes part in the cultural life of this town, becoming a protagonist of the 19th-century art: he attends art galleries, cultural institutions, he makes exhibitions, he is present to collective art shows, he is quoted in remarkable artistic publications, he is given awards and receives great appreciations. He died on 8 February 1982 in Genoa. His works are still in great demand from critics and artistic institutions.

In the town where he was born, a considerable number of his paintings can now be seen and appreciated in museums and foundations, Bigarello public administration has dedicated the City Library to Giuseppe De Luigi. In 2013, thanks the collaboration of xDams organisation has started a project to create a digital archive with pictures, photos and documents about Giuseppe De Luigi
