= Maze procedure =

Maze procedure may refer to:

- Cox maze procedure, a type of cardiac surgery for atrial fibrillation
- Minimaze procedure, cardiac surgery procedures for atrial fibrillation (AF) derived from the original maze procedure
