= Ventriculectomy =

Ventricular reduction
- Other names: Ventricular reduction
- Specialty: Cardiac surgery
- ICD-9-CM: 37.35

Ventriculectomy, or ventricular reduction, is a type of operation in cardiac surgery to reduce enlargement of the heart from cardiomyopathy or ischemic aneurysm formation. In these procedures, part of the ventricular wall is resected. A Batista procedure is a partial left ventriculectomy that is used to treat advanced heart failure. This procedure is not widely used because outcomes are often unsatisfactory.

== See also ==
- Dor procedure
