= Gastrostomy =

Surgical procedure creating opening in stomach

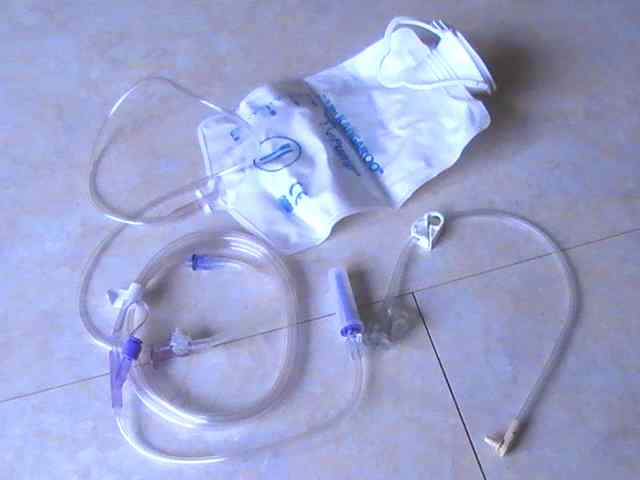
- ICD-9-CM: 43.1
- MeSH: D005774

A gastrostomy is the creation of an artificial external opening into the stomach for nutritional support or gastric decompression. Typically this would include an incision in the patient's epigastrium as part of a formal operation. When originally devised over a century ago the procedure was completed through open surgery using the Stamm technique. It can be performed through surgical approach, percutaneous approach by interventional radiology, percutaneous endoscopic gastrostomy (PEG) or percutaneous ultrasound gastrostomy (PUG).

A gastrostomy may be required due to illness, trauma or disability impacting upon the ability to eat or swallow safely, or conditions causing increased nutritional requirement and once formed (or for some techniques, during formation), a gastrostomy tube is inserted.

== Techniques ==
The Stamm gastrostomy is an open technique, requiring an upper midline laparotomy and gastrotomy, with the catheter brought out in the left hypochondrium. It was first devised in 1894 by the American Gastric Surgeon, Martin Stamm (1847–1918), who was educated greatly in surgery when he visited Germany.

Over the last three decades less invasive approaches such as percutaneous endoscopic gastrostomy (PEG) and laparoscopic assisted Stamm gastrostomy have become increasingly popular.

Conventional PEG involves inserting the primary feeding device through the mouth and extracting it through a small incision formed through the abdomen.

Apparent benefits of PEG include shorter operative times and reduced financial cost.

== Complications ==
Severe complications for gastrostomy formation classify as Clavien-Dindo grade 3 and above, requiring surgical or radiological interventions with potential morbidity and mortality. These complications may occur due to damage to surrounding structures intra-operatively, issues affecting the immature gastrostomy early post-operatively, or be secondary to device or site complications, including: adjacent bowel injury, gastrocolic fistulae, migration of gastrostomy to ribs, and failure for spontaneous closure when gastrostomy no longer needed (persistent gastrocutaneous fistula).

== See also ==
- Enteral feeding
- List of surgeries by type
- Stoma (medicine)
