= Disarticulation =

Misarticulation
- MeSH: D004188

In medical terminology, disarticulation is the separation of two bones at their joint, either traumatically by way of injury or by a surgeon during arthroplasty or amputation.

== See also ==
- Joint dislocation
- Acrotomophilia
- Apotemnophilia
- Amputation
- Total body disruption
