= San Giorgio Bigarello =

- Comune
- Comune di San Giorgio Bigarello
- Flag Coat of arms

- Location within Italy Location within Lombardy
- Coordinates: 45°11′00″N 10°50′50″E
- Country: Italy
- Region: Lombardy
- Province: Mantua (MN)
- Frazioni: Bazza, Bigarello, Caselle, Gazzo, Ghisiolo, Mottella (municipality seat), Stradella, Tripoli, Villanova De Bellis, Villanova Maiardina

Government
  - Mayor: Beniamino Morselli

Area
  - Total: 24.5 km^{2} (9.5 sq mi)
- Elevation: 21 m (69 ft)

Population (31 December 2009)
  - Total: 9,383
  - Density: 383/km^{2} (992/sq mi)
- Demonym: Sangiorgini
- Time zone: UTC+1 (CET)
  - Summer (DST): UTC+2 (CEST)
- Postal code: 46030
- Dialing code: 0376
- Patron saint: St. George Martyr
- Saint day: April 23
- Website: Official website

San Giorgio Bigarello, until 2018 as San Giorgio di Mantova (Mantovano: San Sòrs) is a comune (municipality) in the Province of Mantua in the Italian region Lombardy, located about 130 kilometres (81 mi) east of Milan and about 3 kilometres (2 mi) east of Mantua.

In January 2019 San Giorgio di Mantova merged with Bigarello to form the comune of San Giorgio Bigarello.

The municipality of San Giorgio Bigarello contains the frazioni of Bazza, Bigarello, Caselle, Gazzo, Ghisiolo, Mottella (which is the municipality seat), Stradella, Tripoli, Villanova De Bellis, and Villanova Maiardina. The commune's name refers to an older borough which, during the Napoleonic Wars, was destroyed to make room to fortifications defending Mantua.

== See also ==
- Lovers of Valdaro
