= Ganglionectomy =

Surgical removal of a ganglion

- ICD-9-CM: 04.05, 04.06 05.21 05.29
- MeSH: D015171

A ganglionectomy, also called a gangliectomy, is the surgical removal of a ganglion. The removal of a ganglion cyst usually requires a ganglionectomy. Such cysts usually form on the hand, foot or wrist and may cause pain or impair body function. Aspiration of the cyst and steroid injections are typically performed first. If they fail, the cyst is excised under local, regional or even general anesthetic. Ganglionectomies are also performed for other reasons, such as the treatment of chronic pain.
