= Precerebral artery =

Blood vessel

A precerebral artery is an artery leading to the cerebrum, but not in the cerebrum.

In the human they are:

- Vertebral artery
- Basilar artery
- Common carotid artery
- Internal carotid artery
