= Ostectomy =

Surgical bone removal

- ICD-9-CM: 77.9

An ostectomy is a procedure involving the removal of bone.

Examples include:

- femoral head ostectomy
- Rib removal

In dentistry, ostectomy refers specifically to the removal of bone surrounding a tooth in an attempt to eliminate an adjacent periodontal pocket.

== See also ==
- List of surgeries by type
