= Miller–Abbott tube =

A Miller–Abbott tube is a tube used to treat obstructions in the small intestine through intubation. It was developed in 1934 by William Osler Abbott and Thomas Grier Miller. The device is around 3 metres (9.8 ft) long and has a distal balloon at one end. It is made up of two tubes, one for inflating the balloon when in the duodenum and one for the passage of water. While inserted, barium can be passed through them, and this, alongside radiography, can provide diagnostic information regarding a lesion. A mercury-filled bag has been used with these tubes to assist with decompression of an obstructed intestine, although there are recorded cases of these rupturing and sometimes causing mercury poisoning.
