= Intestine transplantation =

Surgical replacement of the small intestine

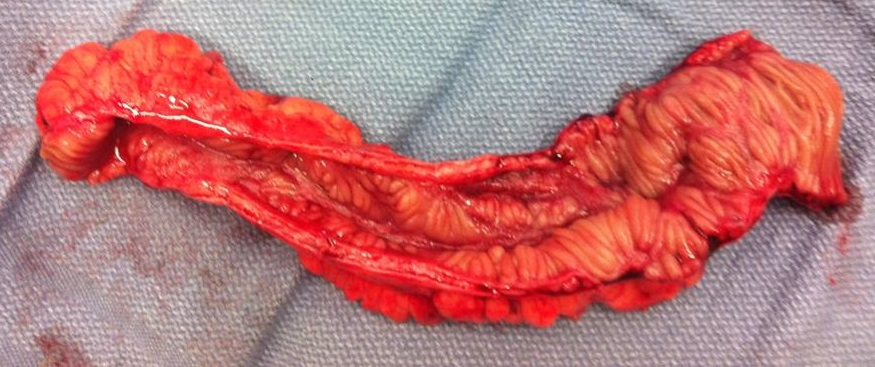
- Resected diseased ileum. The prior removal of sections of small intestine for treatment of precursor conditions is the primary cause of short bowel syndrome (SBS), the leading cause of intestinal transplantation.
- Other names: Small bowel transplantation
- ICD-9-CM: 46.97

Intestine transplantation (intestinal transplantation, or small bowel transplantation) is the surgical replacement of the small intestine for chronic and acute cases of intestinal failure. While intestinal failure can oftentimes be treated with alternative therapies such as parenteral nutrition (PN), complications such as PN-associated liver disease and short bowel syndrome may make transplantation the only viable option. One of the rarest type of organ transplantation performed, intestine transplantation is becoming increasingly prevalent as a therapeutic option due to improvements in immunosuppressive regimens, surgical technique, PN, and the clinical management of pre and post-transplant patients.

== History ==
Intestine transplantation dates back to 1959, when a team of surgeons at the University of Minnesota led by Richard C. Lillehei reported successful transplantation of the small intestine in dogs. Five years later in 1964, Ralph Deterling in Boston attempted the first human intestinal transplant, albeit unsuccessfully. For the next two decades, attempts at transplanting the small intestine in humans were met with universal failure, and patients died of technical complications, sepsis, or graft rejection. However, the discovery of the immunosuppressant ciclosporin in 1972 triggered a revolution in the field of transplant medicine. Due to this discovery, in 1988, the first successful intestinal transplant was performed in Germany by E. Deltz, followed shortly by teams in France and Canada. Intestinal transplantation was no longer an experimental procedure, but rather a life-saving therapy. In 1990, a newer immunosuppressant drug, tacrolimus, appeared on the market as a superior alternative to ciclosporin. In the two decades since, intestine transplant efforts have improved tremendously in both number and outcomes.

== Pre-transplant diagnoses and short bowel syndrome ==
Failure of the small intestine is life-threatening due to the inability to absorb nutrients, fluids, and electrolytes from food. Without these essential substances and the ability to maintain energy balances, homeostasis cannot be maintained and one's prognosis will be dismal. Causes of intestinal failure may be clinically complex, and may result from a combination of nutritional, infectious, traumatic, and metabolic complications that affect ordinary anatomy and physiology. Many underlying conditions that serve as precursors to failure are genetic or congenital in nature. For example, severe inflammation, ulceration, bowel obstruction, fistulation, perforation, or other pathologies of Crohn's disease may severely compromise intestinal function. Despite the danger these conditions may pose in themselves, they may lead to even further, more serious complications that necessitate replacement of the diseased intestine. The single leading cause for an intestinal transplant is affliction with short bowel syndrome, oftentimes a secondary condition of some other form of intestinal disease. Short-bowel syndrome was the cause for 73% of American intestinal transplantations in 2008, followed by functional bowel problems for 15% and other causes representing 12% of cases. Natural SBS is mercifully rare, estimated to be 3 per 100,000 births. Surgical removal is the most common cause, performed as a treatment for various gastroenterological and congenital conditions such as Crohn's disease, necrotizing enterocolitis, mesenteric ischemia, motility disorder, omphalocele/gastroschisis, tumors, and volvulus.

== Alternative treatments ==
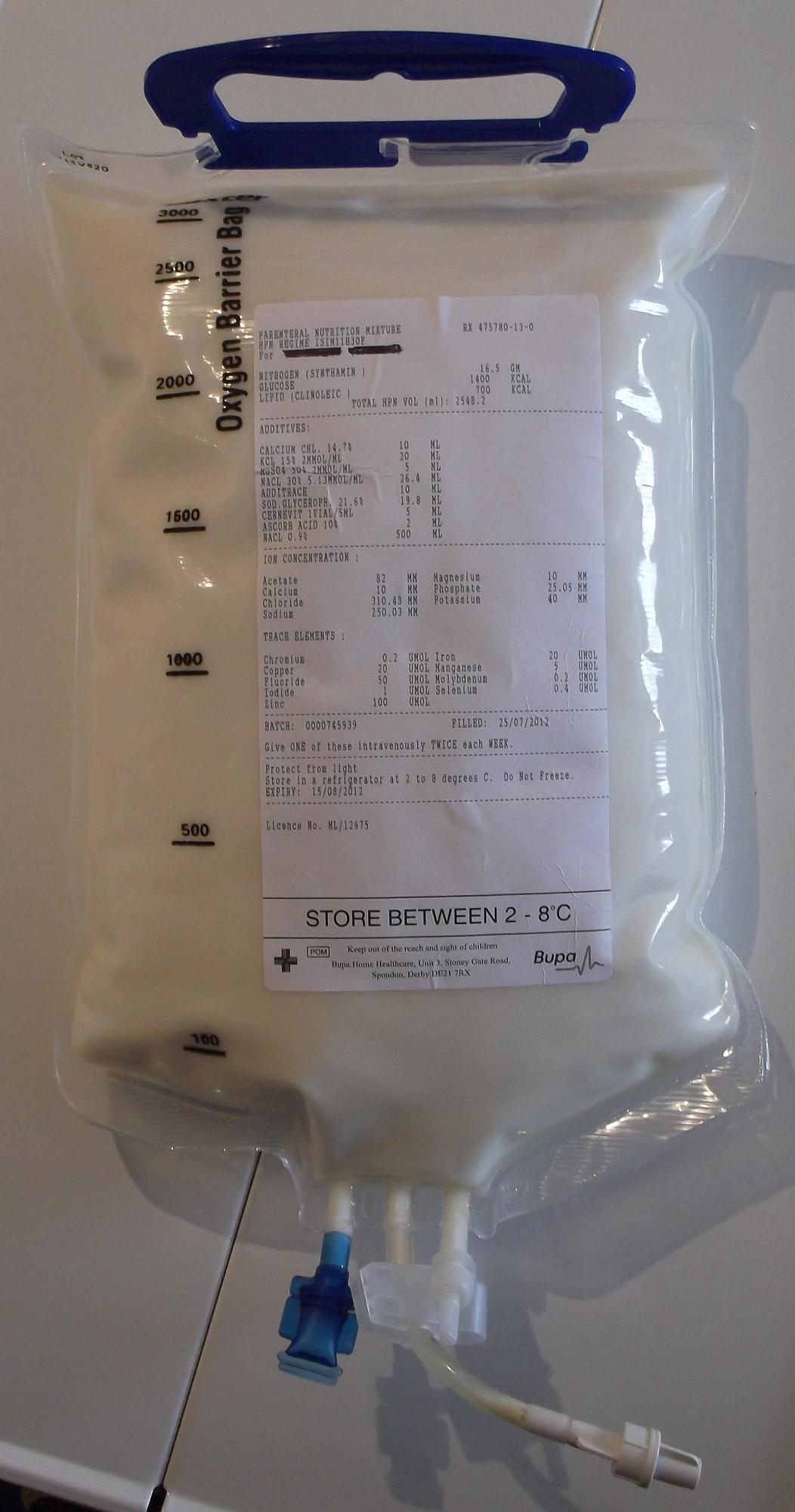
Prescription parenteral nutrition formulation.

Regardless of the underlying condition, the loss of intestinal function does not necessarily necessitate a transplant. Several conditions, such as necrotizing enterocolitis or volvulus, may be adequately resolved by other surgical and nonsurgical treatments, especially if SBS never develops. An individual can obtain nutrients intravenously through PN, bypassing food consumption entirely and its subsequent digestion. Long-term survival with SBS and without PN is possible with enteral nutrition, but this is inadequate for many patients as it depends on the remaining intestine's ability to adapt and increase its absorptive capacity. Although more complicated and expensive to perform, any person may receive PN. Although PN can meet all energy, fluid, and nutrient needs and can be performed at home, quality of life can be significantly decreased. On average, PN takes 10 to 16 hours to administer but can take up to 24. Over this time frame, daily life can be significantly hindered as a consequence of attachment to the IV pump. Over long periods of time, PN can lead to numerous health conditions, including severe dehydration, catheter-related infections, and liver disease. PN-associated liver disease strikes up to 50% of patients within 5–7 years, correlated with a mortality rate of 2–50%.

Another alternative treatment to transplant for patients with SBS is surgical bowel lengthening via either serial transverse enteroplasty (STEP) or the older longitudinal intestinal lengthening and tailoring (LILT) technique. Although both procedures contribute to an approximate 70% increase in length, STEP appears somewhat more favorable in terms of lower mortality and progression to transplant. Nevertheless, a positive reception to either procedure may reduce the level of PN required, if not negate its required use altogether.

== Indications ==
There are four Medicare and Medicaid-approved indications for intestine transplantation: a loss of two of the six major routes of venous access, multiple episodes of catheter-associated life-threatening sepsis, fluid and electrolyte abnormalities in the face of maximal medical therapy, and PN-associated liver disease. Transplants may also be performed if the growth and development of a pediatric patient fails to ensue, or in extreme circumstances for patients with an exceptionally low quality of life on PN. A multidisciplinary team consisting of transplant surgeons, gastroenterologists, dieticians, anesthesiologists, psychiatrists, financial representatives, and other specialists should be consulted to evaluate the treatment plan and ensure transplantation is the patient's best option. Psychological preparations should be made for the transplant team and patient as well. Early referral requires trust between all parties involved in the operation to ensure that a rush to judgment does not lead to a premature transplant.

Other absolute contraindications to receiving an intestinal transplant include the presence of systemic and untreated local infections, malignant cancer, severe neurological impairment, and severe cardiac and/or pulmonary disease. These criteria are similar to established guidelines for transplants of other organ types. HIV infection is a relative contraindication for intestine transplantation; desperate terminal patients may accept a transplant from a HIV-positive donor if they are willing to expose themselves to HIV.

== Transplant types ==
There are three major types of intestine transplants: an isolated intestinal graft, a combined intestinal-liver graft, and a multivisceral graft in which other abdominal organs may be transplanted as well. In the most basic and common graft, an isolated intestinal graft, only sections of the jejunum and ileum are transplanted. These are performed in the absence of liver failure. In the event of severe liver dysfunction due to PN, enzyme deficiencies, or other underlying factors, the liver may be transplanted along with the intestine. In a multivisceral graft, the stomach, duodenum, pancreas, and/or colon may be included in the graft. Multivisceral grafts are considered when the underlying condition significantly compromises other sections of the digestive system, such as intra-abdominal tumors that have not yet metastasized, extensive venous thrombosis or arterial ischemia of the mesentery, and motility syndromes.

== Pre-operative period ==
Donated intestines, like all organs, should be matched to a recipient prior to recovery, as to prepare him or her and minimize the time the organ spends outside the body. Potential recipients are placed on the International Intestinal Transplant Registry (ITR), where they contribute to the world's growing understanding of intestine transplantation. Before a transplant may be performed, an organ must first be located. In the United States, the matching of all organs is coordinated by the United Network for Organ Sharing (UNOS). The standard intestinal donor is deceased with a diagnosis of brain death. In terms of transplant outcomes, brain-dead donors are highly preferable to donors who have suffered cardiopulmonary death. If respiration can be assisted by a ventilator, brain-dead donors may exhibit maintainable cardiac, endocrine, and excretory function. If appropriately managed, the continuation of blood flow and bodily metabolism allows for healthier organs for procurement and additional time to prepare recipients for transplant. Furthermore, terminal ileum recovery from living donors is possible., and a laparoscopic technique is being developed to harvest limited sections of small bowel from living donors. When determining potential donor-recipient matches, important characteristics include donor size, age, tissue quality, and ABO and histo-compatibility. If the intestine is too large, it may be not transplantable into young or small patients. Ideally, intestines should be selected from donors of lighter weight than the proposed recipients to ensure simple closure of the abdominal wound. If a patient is too young or too old, they may not be hardy enough to survive the operation and recovery period. If the donor and recipient organs do not meet compatibility requirements, the threat of organ rejection by the body is all but certain.

Organ rejection is the unfortunate circumstance of the host immune system recognizing the transplanted organ as foreign. This is the most notable complication facing transplant recipients. Through T-cell receptors, T-lymphocytes are able to distinguish between self and non-self by recognizing human leukocyte antigens (HLA) bound to the major histocompatibility complex (MHC) protein located on the surface of organ cells. Once identified as foreign, the immune system proceeds to destroy the transplanted tissue. The panel-reactive antibody (PRA) test measures the proportion of the population to which a recipient will react via pre-existing antibodies to various HLA antigens; in other words, how likely a patient is to acutely reject their new transplant. Therefore, it is essential that HLA and PRA statuses are tested for and demonstrate low immunoreactivity of the patient to the graft. In some cases, a recipient may suffer from graft-versus-host disease, in which cells of the transplanted organ attack the recipient's cells.

To ensure proper histocompatibility, tissue quality, and safety from infection, blood work should be collected and tested in the laboratory. In addition to HLA and PRA typing, the complete blood count (CBC), coagulation profile, complete metabolic panel, and ABO blood group determination tests should be performed for both the donor and recipient. ABO-incompatible grafts can sometimes be performed on very young pediatric patients, as their immune systems have not fully developed and for whom waiting list mortality remains high. Additionally, blood serum should be tested for the presence of viruses, including HIV, hepatitis B and C, cytomegalovirus (CMV), and Epstein–Barr virus (EBV) antibodies to prevent infection. Particularly in the immunocompromised system necessitated by the transplant, these viruses can wreak havoc on the body and become extremely dangerous, even fatal. Even with healthy physiological levels, ABO and HLA compatibilities, and no signs of bacterial, viral, and fungal infections, organ transplantation is not without extrasurgical risk.

== Waitlist and donation outcomes ==
A major challenge facing the intestinal transplant enterprise is meeting the need for transplantable intestines, particularly in the United States where the majority of intestinal transplants take place. There exists a narrow timeslot between procurement and transplantation that any organ remains viable, and logistical challenges are faced regarding bringing organ and recipient together. During procurement, organs that are being recovered are cooled and perfused with preservation solution. This slows organ activity and increases the time they remain viable for transplant. Although chilling and perfusion may extend intestinal lifespans by several hours, failure is still imminent unless transplanted. This duration between the cooling of the organ during procurement and the restoration of physiological temperature during implantation is the cold ischemic time. Due to the sensitivity of the intestine to ischemic injury, many potential donor intestines are lost to the events following brain death and trauma. Furthermore, irreversible intestinal damage is seen after approximately only 5 hours of cold ischemia in the form of mucosal damage and bacterial translocation outside the gastrointestinal tract. Therefore, ensuring cardiac survival and nearby donor-recipient proximity before procurement are essential so organs do not wait too long outside the body and without blood flow. Not only is there a lack of transplantable intestines, but a deficiency in the number of centers possessing the capability to carry out the complicated transplant procedure as well. As of 2005, there were only 61 medical centers in the world capable of executing an intestinal transplant. Furthermore, many young, small children, particularly those weighing less than 5 kg, cannot find a transplant due to the lack of size-matched donors.

Despite these challenges, obtaining an intestine for transplant is rather probable in the United States. In 2008, there were 212 people on the U.S. intestinal transplant waitlist, 94% of whom were U.S. citizens. Regardless of transplant type, over half of new registrants are 5 years of age or younger. Adults compromise the next largest cohort, followed by pediatric patients aged 6 and older. In 2008, the ethnic composition of the intestinal transplant waitlist was 65% White, 18% Black, 16% Hispanic, 1% Asian, and 0.5% other or mixed race, resembling the demographics of the American general population at the time aside from a below-average Asian cohort. ABO blood types also matched the general population, with 31% A, 14% B, 5% AB, and 50% O. In 2004, the average waiting period to receive a transplant was 220 days, with a median of 142 days in 2008. The rate of waitlist additions has shifted from year to year; gains increased until 2006 (with 317 added), but then decreased in 2012 (to 124 added). In 2007, only 9% of patients on the U.S. waitlist died while waiting for a transplant. Waitlist mortality peaked around 2002 and was highest for liver-intestine (pediatric) patients. Deaths among all pediatric groups awaiting intestine-liver transplants have decreased in the years leading up to 2014 whereas adult intestine-liver deaths have dropped less dramatically. The decrease in recent years is likely due to improved care of infants with intestinal failure and subsequently a decrease in referrals for transplant. Although many improvements have been made in the States, outcomes everywhere still demonstrate much room for improvement. Worldwide, 25% of pediatric patients on the waitlist for an intestinal transplant die before they can receive one.

== Procurement protocol ==
Following matching of the organ, the complicated procurement of the small bowel can be performed by a team of abdominal transplant surgeons. Once a donor has been selected and approved for donation, several pretreatments may be initiated to destroy microorganisms and immune cells. The donor intestine must be decontaminated with several antibiotics, including neomycin, erythromycin, amphotericin B, and cephalosporin. They may also be treated with anti-lymphocyte antibodies (anti-thymocyte globulin, alemtuzumab), irradiation directed against excessive mesenteric lymphatic tissue, and have their bowel irrigated.

Once donor preparation is accomplished, procurement can begin by utilizing the same standard techniques for all abdominal organ procurements. The team exposes the abdominal cavity and inserts two cannulae for the infusion of University of Wisconsin organ preservation solution into the aorta and inferior mesenteric vein. As the abdominal organs are cooled in situ, the surrounding tissue is dissected so that they may be quickly extracted. In the next step, the aorta is cross-clamped, cutting off blood supply to the organs. Once blood and oxygen supply to an organ is cut off, organ death will approach swiftly unless steps are taken to preserve them until transplant. Organs are therefore fully drained of blood, flushed with cool preservation solution, and removed from the body. In an isolated intestinal transplant, the colon will be detached from the small intestine. The cecum and ascending colon are devascularized, while care is taken to preserve major vasculature in the ileum. The jejunum will be separated from the duodenum while preserving the vasculature of the jejunum, ileum, mesentery, and the pancreas. If healthy, the pancreas can oftentimes be retrieved as an additional isolated procurement. The intestinal allograft, when ready to be extracted, is attached by the mesenteric pedicle, where the vessels converge out of the intestinal system. This pedicle will be stapled closed, and can be separated from the body via a transverse cut to create a vascular cuff. The complete intestinal allograft can then be removed and wrapped in a surgical towel. The protocols for combined liver and multivisceral procurements are far more complicated and meticulous than isolated intestine alone.

== Transplantation protocol ==
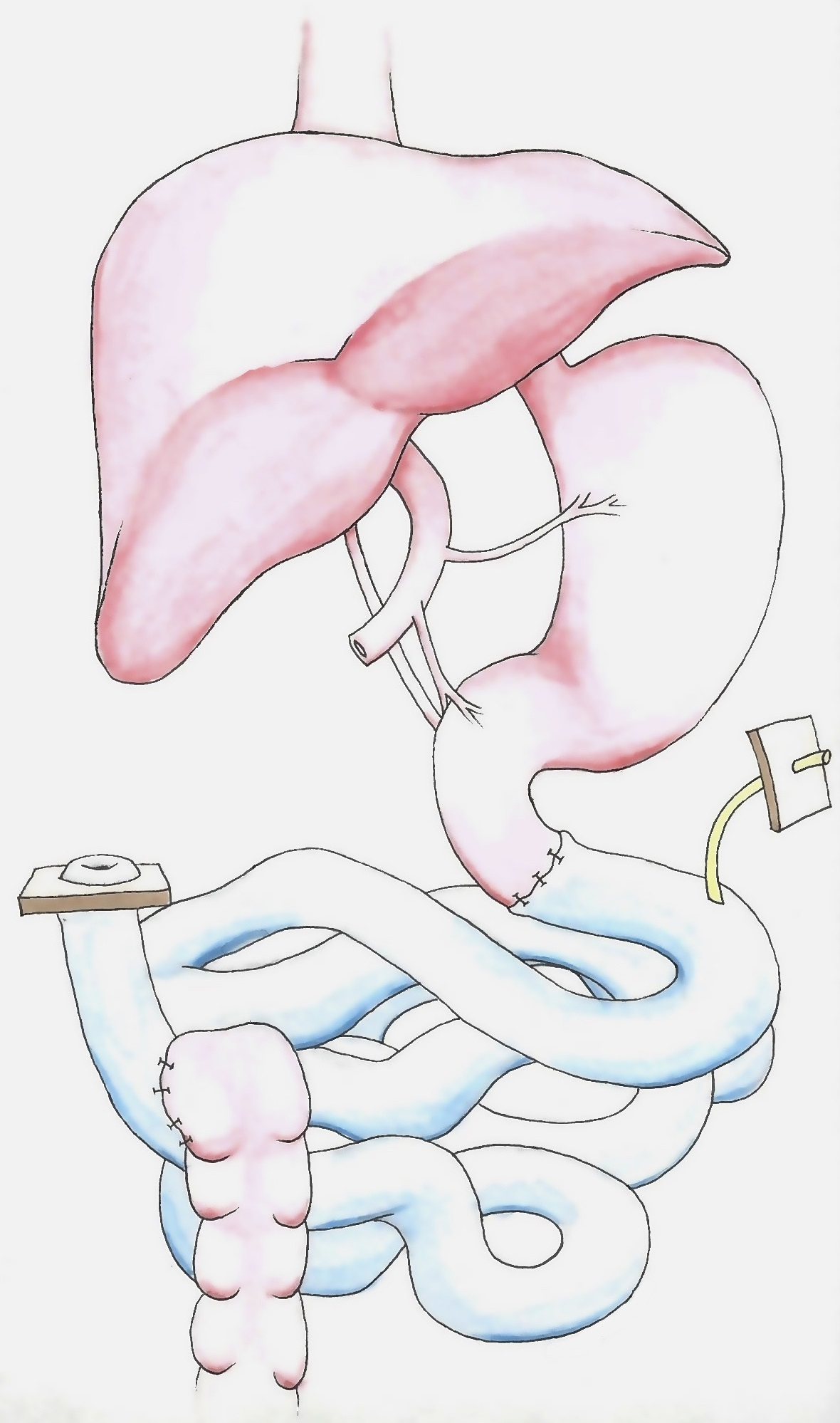
Isolated intestine transplant diagram.

First, any abdominal scar tissue from previous surgeries must be removed. The aorta and vena cava are dissected in preparation for vascular anastomosis, followed by dissection of the proximal and distal ends of the digestive tract. Anastomosis is then performed to revascularize the graft. Arterial vessels are connected to the abdominal aorta, below the kidneys. However, venous drainage, or the reattachment of the transplanted organ to the venous system, may be performed differently depending on the unique intra-abdominal vasculature of the recipient. The graft is usually drained systemically into the infrarenal vena cava, but may also be drained portally into the hepatic portal or superior mesenteric vein. The graft is then reperfused with blood and any bleeding is stopped before the proximal and distal ends of the transplant bowel are connected to the original digestive tract. A loop ileostomy is then created as to provide easy access for future endoscopic observation and biopsies. A gastrostomy or jejunostomy feeding tube may be placed before the abdominal wall is closed.

When a liver is being transplanted in conjunction with the intestine, the recipient must first have their own liver removed. Following this, the aorta, cava, and portal veins of the donor and recipient are anastomosed. The graft is then flushed before the caval clamps are removed. The intestine is then reconstructed as in an isolated intestinal transplant, before being connected to the bile duct servicing the new liver. Multivisceral transplants are especially difficult and susceptible to complications because all organs must survive a conjoined procurement, transport, and transplantation. All three of these measures are tailored to the individual needs of the recipient. Preservation of the native spleen, pancreas, and duodenum during a multivisceral transplant can reduce the risk of additional complications related to these structures.

== Post-operative period ==
Following the procedure, the patient is actively monitored in an intensive care unit (ICU). Broad-spectrum antibiotics are administered, bleeding monitored, and serum pH and lactate levels measured for evidence of intestinal ischemia. The patient's immune system is strongly modulated immediately post-operation. The initial phase of treatment consists of the administration of tacrolimus with corticosteroids to suppress T-lymphocyte activation. Next, various assortments of interleukin-2 (IL-2) receptor antagonists (daclizumab, basiliximab), anti-proliferation agents (azathioprine, mycophenolate mofetil), and the drugs cyclophosphamide and sirolimus are administered on an individual patient basis to further suppress the immune system. The bioavailability of these drugs is dependent on intestinal surface area and transit time, and therefore the length of the allograft determines the immunosuppression regimen. Intravenous administration of prostaglandin E1 is occasionally performed for the first 5 to 10 days following transplant to improve intestinal circulation and a potential dispensing of immunosuppressive effects. The gut is selectively decontaminated against high-risk flora and preventative care is taken against CMV and fungal infections.

It is ideal to commence enteral nutrition as early as possible following transplantation. Therefore, a feeding tube connecting to the stomach or jejunum is quickly placed to facilitate rehabilitation. If gastrointestinal function is restored, a diet can be reestablished and cautiously advanced as tolerated. Most patients are weaned from PN within 4 weeks of transplantation, and nearly all are free from additional enteral supplementation by one year. Evidence for the restoration of function includes decreasing gastrostomy tube returns and increasing gas and enteric contents in the ileostomy. Routine surveillance endoscopy and biopsies via the ileostomy should be performed with decreasing frequency over several months to observe signs of rejection, ideally before clinical symptoms present themselves. Should the patient continue to perform well through the first post-transplant year, the ileostomy would generally be closed. Should rejection be suspected in the future, endoscopies would be performed and an appropriate antirejection therapy will be tailored. The median time for hospital discharge varies between procedures. The median times for isolated intestine, intestine-liver, and multivisceral transplants are 30, 60, and 40 days post-operation respectively. Within the first several months, carbohydrate and amino acid absorptive capacity should normalize, followed by the absorptive capacity for fats. Once enteral nutrition is capable of providing all nutritional needs, PN can be discontinued. Nearly all patients with a successful transplant are free of PN within one year.

== Biological complications ==
Intestinal transplantation is the least performed type of transplant due to a number of unique obstacles. The most major of these is the profound immunosuppression required due to the ability of the intestine to elicit strong immune responses. Because of exposure to a wide range of gut flora and material consumed by the body, the intestinal epithelium possesses a highly developed innate immune system and antigen-presenting abilities. Immunosuppression is the primary determinant of outcome in small bowel transplantation; the risk for graft rejection is increased by under-immunosuppression and for local and systemic infection with over-immunosuppression. Ensuring an appropriate dose of immunosuppressant can therefore be difficult, especially as both ciclosporin (14–36%) and tacrolimus (8.5–22%) have generally low bioavailabilities. A major problem due to immunosuppression in intestinal transplant patients is post-transplant lymphoproliferative disorder, in which B-lymphocytes excessively proliferate due to infection by EBV and result in infectious mononucleosis-like lesions. Intestinal transplant recipients are also at risk for chronic renal failure because calcineurin inhibitors are toxic to the kidneys. A transplant recipient must remain on immunosuppressants for the rest of his or her life.

Intestinal transplants are highly susceptible to infection even more so than the standard immunocompromised recipient of other organs due to the great composition and variety of the gut flora. A complex assortment of microorganisms inhabits the human digestive tract, with concentrations of up to 10^{4}–10^{7} CFU/mL in the jejunoileum and 10^{11}–10^{12} CFU/mL in the colon. While suppression of the immune system may prevent immune attack on the new allograft, it may also prevent the immune system's ability to keep certain gut microbial populations in line. Despite pre and post-decontamination of the transplant, recipients are at risk of local and systemic infection by both natural and external flora. The common symptom of graft dysfunction, whether due to infection, rejection, or some other condition, is diarrhea.

== Transplant outcomes and impact ==
Intestinal transplant outcomes have improved significantly in recent years. Despite mild incongruities in survival rate percentages between centers in North America, Europe, Australia, and elsewhere, intestinal transplantations mostly approach survivorship rates of lung transplantation. At one-year, graft survival rates for isolated intestine currently waver around 80%, and 70% for intestine-liver and multivisceral. Over the same time period, patient survival for isolated intestine patients may even exceed 90%, while the more complicated multiorgan transplants do not show any increase in patient survival when compared to patients surviving with the intestinal graft alone. The five-year survival rate for patients and transplants ranges from 50 to 80% (overall mean 60%), depending on underlying disease and presurgical morbidity. Very young (<1 year) and very old (>60 years) patients receiving a transplant have pronounced rates of mortality. After 4 years, pediatric survival significantly worsens compared to adults.

Several factors relating to superior patient and graft prognosis have proven to be statistically significant. Patients who have been admitted for transplant directly from home rather than the hospital, younger patients over one year of age, those receiving their first transplant, those receiving transplants at experienced transplant centers, and who receive antibody or sirolimus-based induction therapies have increased rates of survival. Furthermore, underlying etiology, the presence of comorbidity, the frequency of previous surgery, nutritional status, and the level of liver function have been found to affect patient-graft survival . Patients with a pre-transplant diagnosis of volvulus were found to possess a lower risk of mortality. As of 2008, the longest recorded surviving transplant survived for 18 years. Between 1999 and 2008, 131 retransplant procedures were performed in the United States.

The improvement to quality of life following an intestinal transplantation is significant. Of living patients 6 months after transplant, 70% are considered to have regained full intestinal function, 15% are at partial function, and 15% have had their grafts removed. For those with full function, enteral nutritional autonomy is high. The ability to resume regular activities such as the ability to consume food and exert control over digestive function is certainly a welcome return for patients. The low quality of life induced by intestinal failure is oftentimes further supplemented by significant psychosocial disability and narcotic dependence. Following transplantation, these have been found to generally decrease. According to surveys comparing patients who have undergone transplants and those that have not, there seems to be a remarkable improvement for transplant recipients in such areas as anxiety, depression, appearance, stress, parenting, impulsiveness, optimism, medical compliance, and the quality of relationships.

== Financial considerations ==
Receiving an organ transplant of any kind is a highly significant investment financially, but a successful, well-functioning transplant can be very cost-efficient relative to alternate therapies. Total charges to maintain PN at home can reach upwards of $150,000 a year, even though the actual cost of nutrition is typically only $18 to $22 a day. This excludes the cost for additional home support, equipment, and the care of PN-related complications. The cost involved in undergoing intestinal transplantation, including the initial hospitalization for the transplant, can range from $150,000 to $400,000, and reoccurring hospitalizations are common up through the second year. Two to three years post-transplant, the financial cost of transplantation reaches parity with PN and is more cost-effective thereafter.
