= JoAnn E. Manson =

American physician

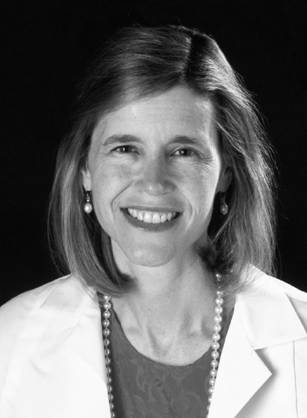
- JoAnn E. Manson
- Born: 1953 (age 72–73); Cleveland, Ohio
- Education: Harvard College; Case Western Reserve University School of Medicine; Harvard School of Public Health
- Spouse: Christopher N. Ames
- Scientific career
- Fields: Medicine; Epidemiology; Endocrinology; Women's health
- Workplaces: Harvard University

JoAnn Elisabeth Manson (born 1953) is an American physician and professor known for her pioneering research, public leadership, and advocacy in the fields of epidemiology and women's health.

Manson's research has contributed to the understanding of the causes of chronic diseases including cardiovascular disease, diabetes, and breast cancer. She is one of the most highly cited researchers in the world according to Google Scholar, with an h-index of over 300. She is the Michael and Lee Bell Professor of Women's Health at Harvard Medical School, a professor of epidemiology in the Harvard School of Public Health, and chief of the Division of Preventive Medicine at Brigham and Women's Hospital.

== Biography ==
=== Early life ===
Manson was born in 1953 in Cleveland, Ohio. Her father was a NASA engineer, and her mother a medical social worker. In high school she showed interest in chemistry, as well as in artistic pursuits including painting, sculpture, and the harp.

=== Career ===
Manson is board certified in both internal medicine and the subspecialty of endocrinology and metabolism. Her major research interests include preventive medicine and chronic disease epidemiology, particularly risk factors for cardiovascular disease, diabetes, and cancer in women. She is principal investigator for several grants from the National Institutes of Health, including the Women's Health Initiative Vanguard Clinical Center at Brigham and Women's Hospital in Boston, Women's Antioxidant and Folic Acid Cardiovascular Trial, Biochemical and Genetic Risk Factors for CVD in Women, and the Vitamin D and Omega-3 Trial, among others. She is also principal investigator of the Boston site for the Kronos Early Estrogen Prevention Study. Manson is a member of many professional societies and serves on the editorial/medical advisory boards of several medical journals. Manson is also the principal investigator of the nation-wide COSMOS trial to study the effects of cocoa flavanols and multivitamin supplementation on cardiovascular disease and cancer.

ScienceWatch ranked Manson as one of the most-cited researchers in clinical medicine during the decade between 1995 and 2005. Manson was the most-cited woman researcher on the list. She has also been recognized as a Clarivate Highly Cited Researcher.

In terms of translating medical information for the public and clinicians, Manson is an expert video commentator for Medscape/WebMD. She was previously a health columnist for Glamour, for which she wrote the monthly column: "Your Doctor Is In", and a health expert for Everyday Health.

She was also president of the North American Menopause Society in 2011–2012.

== Research ==
Major interests include the role of vitamin D, omega-3s, and folate in the prevention of CVD, diabetes, and cancer, and assessment of endocrinologic predictors of breast cancer. In several large-scale prospective cohort studies and randomized clinical trials, Manson has assessed the benefits and risks of menopausal estrogen/hormone therapy and the role of lifestyle factors and therapeutic interventions in the prevention of chronic disease in women. She has also been actively involved in studies of biomarker and genetic predictors of cardiovascular disease and diabetes.

== Awards and recognition ==
She has received the "Henry Ingersoll Bowditch Award for Excellence in Public Health" from the Massachusetts Medical Society in 2002, the "Woman in Science" Award from the American Medical Women's Association in 2003, election to membership in the Association of American Physicians in 2005, fellowship in the American Association for the Advancement of Science, the Harvard College "Women's Professional Achievement Award" in 2006, the North American Menopause Society's "Postmenopausal Cardiovascular Health Research Award" in 2007, the International Menopause Society's "Henry Burger Research Prize" in 2008, the American Heart Association's Population Research Prize in 2010, election to membership in the Institute of Medicine of the National Academies (National Academy of Medicine) in 2011, and the American Heart Association's Distinguished Scientist Award in 2011 and Research Achievement Award in 2020. Manson also received the Alma Dea Morani Renaissance Woman Award in 2022, was named to Mastership in the American College of Physicians in 2022, and received the Outstanding Clinical Investigator Laureate Award from the Endocrine Society in 2025. She was one of the physicians featured in the National Library of Medicine's exhibition, "History of American Women Physicians", in Bethesda, Maryland. She is also recognized by Thomson Reuters as among the top 1% most cited scientists in the world and was named Best Female Scientist in the World in 2022–2024 by Research.com based on citation and H-index metrics.

== Publications ==
=== Journal articles ===
Manson has authored or co-authored more than 1,200 peer-reviewed publications in the medical literature.

=== Books ===
- The 30-Minute Fitness Solution : A Four-Step Plan For Women of All Ages. Cambridge, Mass., Harvard University Press. 2001. ISBN 0-674-00479-5
- Hot Flashes, Hormones, and Your Health. New York, McGraw-Hill. 2006. ISBN 0-07-146862-5
- Healthy Women, Healthy Lives. New York, New York, Simon and Schuster. 2001. ISBN 0-684-85519-4
- Prevention of Myocardial Infarction. New York, New York, Oxford University Press 1996. ISBN 0-19-508582-5 (Editor-in-Chief)
- Clinical Trials in Heart Disease. Elsevier Saunders 2004. ISBN 0-7216-0408-0 (Editor)
