= Longitudinal intestinal lengthening and tailoring =

- Specialty: Gastroenterology

The longitudinal intestinal lengthening and tailoring (Bianchi) procedure is a form of autologous intestinal reconstruction. The small bowel is divided longitudinally in the midline, preserving one leaf of mesentery with its blood supply to each half. This results in two vascularized segments of small bowel which can then be rejoined end-to-end to restore continuity of the small bowel. There are also another ways of performing this procedure. it is one of the surgical therapeutic options along with other surgical options such as small bowel segmental reversal, artificial intestinal valve construction, electrical pacing of the small bowel, serial transverse enteroplasty, or transplantation in treatment of short gut syndrome.

The procedure was first described by Bianchi in 1980 in a porcine model and first applied clinically by Boeckman and Traylor in 1981.
