= David Hackam =

David J. Hackam is a surgeon-scientist.

Hackam obtained his bachelor's and medical degrees from the University of Western Ontario, then earned a doctorate in cell biology from the University of Toronto. He joined the faculty of the University of Pittsburgh School of Medicine in 2002, and was named the Watson Family Professor of Surgery in 2010. Hackam left for the Robert Garrett Professorship of Pediatric Surgery at Johns Hopkins University School of Medicine in 2014. Hackam specializes in necrotizing enterocolitis.
