= Fish oil (medical use) =

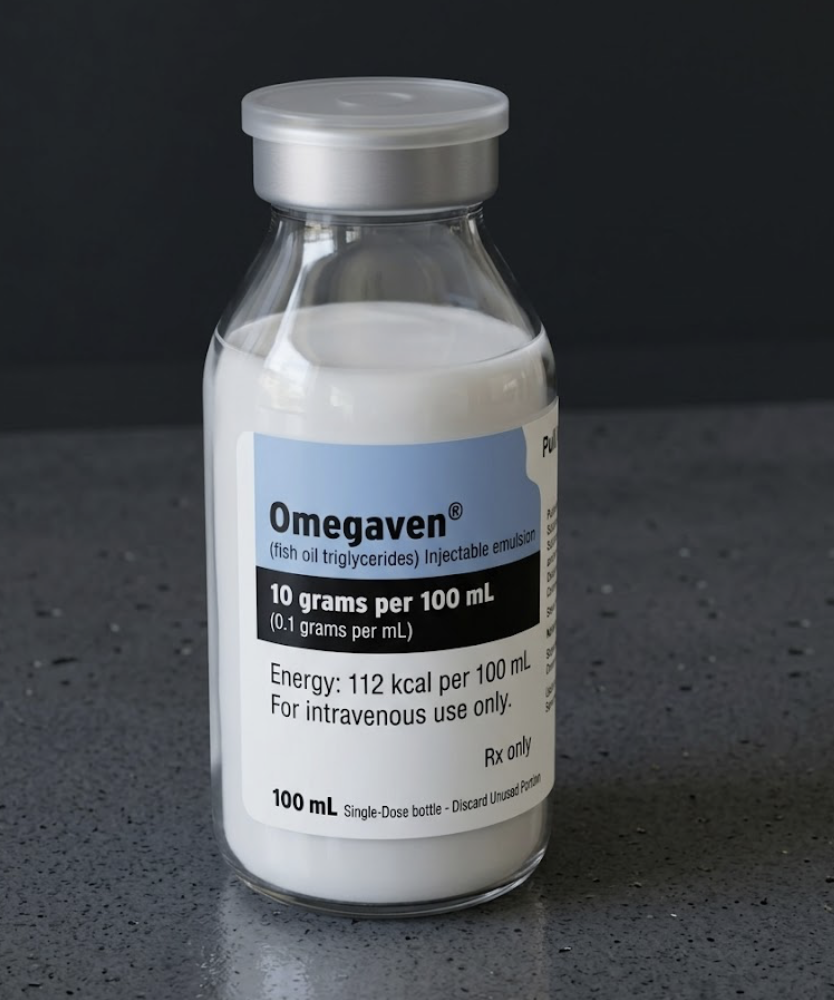

Clinical data
- Trade names: Omegaven
- Other names: Fish oil triglycerides
- AHFS/Drugs.com: Professional Drug Facts
- License data: US DailyMed: Omegaven
- Pregnancy category: AU: B3
- Dependence liability: Intravenous
- Drug class: Intravenous nutritional products
- ATC code: None

Legal status
- Legal status: US: ℞-only

Fish oil, sold under the brand name Omegaven, is a fatty acid emulsion. It is used for total parenteral nutrition (feeding directly into a venous catheter), e.g. in short bowel syndrome. It is rich in omega-3 fatty acids.

Fish oil triglycerides was approved for use in the United States in July 2018, and is available to people on the US market by prescription effective November 2018.

In 2021, it was the 283rd most commonly prescribed medication in the United States, with more than 700,000 prescriptions.

== Research ==
It has gained popularity in children in preference to the more commonly used intralipid after case reports that it reduced the risk of liver damage.

A 2007, study indicated that the use of Omegaven may be an appropriate intervention strategy for newborns with a very low birth weight, gastroschisis, and intestinal atresia.

A clinical trial exploring the use of fish oil as an adjunct to parenteral nutrition in surgical intensive care units at National Taiwan University Hospital completed in March 2007.

Although the use of fish oil triglycerides in children in the United States is experimental, the use of it in adults in Europe is less controversial. In European studies, fish oil triglycerides have been associated with a reduction in psoriasis, when contrasted to administration of omega-6 fatty acid Lipoven. Fish oil triglycerides have also been associated with reduced mortality and antibiotic use during hospital stays.
