= Glucagon-like peptide-2 receptor =

Protein-coding gene in the species Homo sapiens

GLP2R
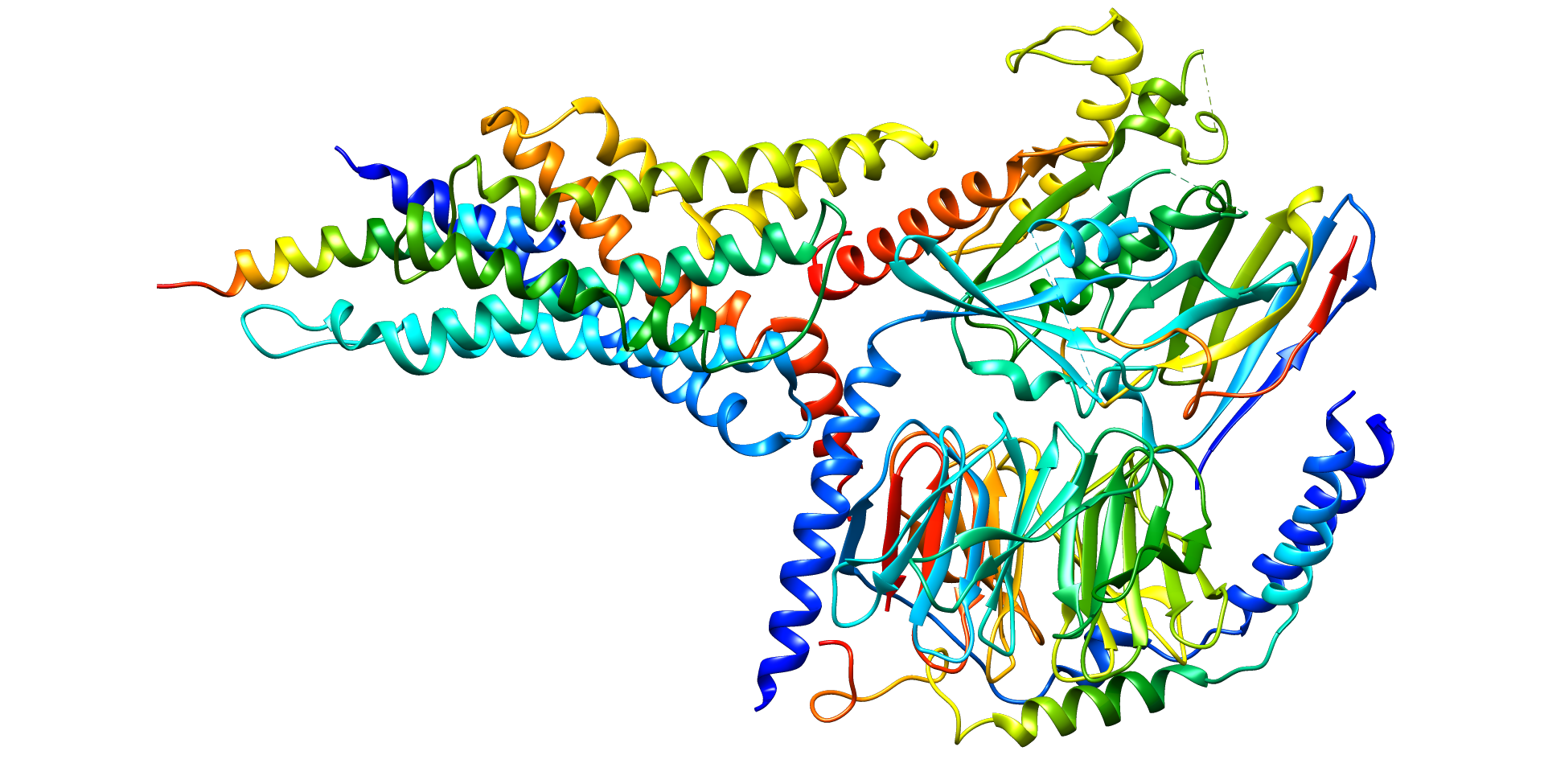

Identifiers
- Aliases: GLP2R, entrez:9340, glucagon like peptide 2 receptor
- External IDs: OMIM: 603659; MGI: 2136733; GeneCards: GLP2R
Available structures
PDB	Ortholog search: PDBe RCSB
PDB	List of PDB id codes 7D68

Gene location (Human)
Chr.	Chromosome 17 (human)
Band	17p13.1	Start	9,822,206 bp
Band	17p13.1	End	9,892,099 bp

Gene location (Mouse)
Chr.	Chromosome 11 (mouse)
Band	11|11 B3	Start	67,552,328 bp
Band	11|11 B3	End	67,661,979 bp
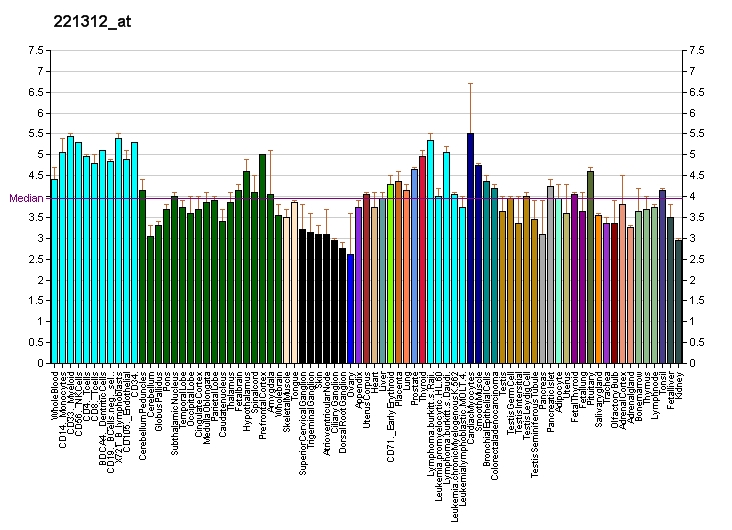
RNA expression pattern
Bgee	Human / Mouse (ortholog); Top expressed in: testicle; epithelium of colon; gallbladder; muscle layer of sigmoid colon; transverse colon; gastric mucosa; rectum; mucosa of transverse colon; gonad; canal of the cervix / Top expressed in: neural layer of retina; Hindgut; midgut; jejunum; ileum; colon; urinary bladder; dentate gyrus of hippocampal formation granule cell; duodenum; rectum; More reference expression data
BioGPS	More reference expression data
Gene ontology
Molecular function	G protein-coupled receptor activity; glucagon receptor activity; transmembrane signaling receptor activity; signal transducer activity; G protein-coupled peptide receptor activity; peptide hormone binding
Cellular component	integral component of membrane; plasma membrane; membrane
Biological process	cellular response to glucagon stimulus; cell surface receptor signaling pathway; positive regulation of cell population proliferation; signal transduction; adenylate cyclase-modulating G protein-coupled receptor signaling pathway; G protein-coupled receptor signaling pathway
Sources:Amigo / QuickGO
Orthologs
Databases	NCBI: entry; OMA: entry
Species	Human	Mouse
Entrez	9340	93896
Ensembl	ENSG00000065325	ENSMUSG00000049928
UniProt	O95838	Q5IXF8
RefSeq (mRNA)	NM_004246	NM_175681
RefSeq (protein)	NP_004237	NP_783612
Location (UCSC)	Chr 17: 9.82 – 9.89 Mb	Chr 11: 67.55 – 67.66 Mb
PubMed search
- Wikidata
View/Edit Human	View/Edit Mouse

Glucagon-like peptide-2 receptor (GLP-2R) is a protein that in human is encoded by the GLP2R gene located on chromosome 17.

== Function ==
The GLP2 receptor (GLP2R) is a G protein-coupled receptor superfamily member closely related to the glucagon receptor (GLP1 receptor). Glucagon-like peptide-2 (GLP2) is a 33-amino acid proglucagon-derived peptide produced by intestinal enteroendocrine cells. Like glucagon-like peptide-1 (GLP1) and glucagon itself, it is derived from the proglucagon peptide encoded by the GCG gene. GLP2 stimulates intestinal growth and upregulates villus height in the small intestine, concomitant with increased crypt cell proliferation and decreased enterocyte apoptosis. Moreover, GLP2 prevents intestinal hypoplasia resulting from total parenteral nutrition. GLP2R, a G protein-coupled receptor superfamily member is expressed in the gut and closely related to the glucagon receptor (GCGR) and the receptor for GLP1 (GLP1R).

== See also ==
- Glucagon-like peptide-2
