= Serial transverse enteroplasty =

Surgical procedure used primarily in the treatment of short bowel syndrome

- Specialty: Gastroenterology

Serial transverse enteroplasty (STEP) is a surgical procedure used primarily in the treatment of short bowel syndrome (SBS). In STEP, by making cuts in the intestine and creating a zigzag pattern, surgeons lengthen the amount of bowel available to absorb nutrients. The procedure was first performed in 2003 and more than 100 patients had undergone the surgery by 2013.

== Background ==
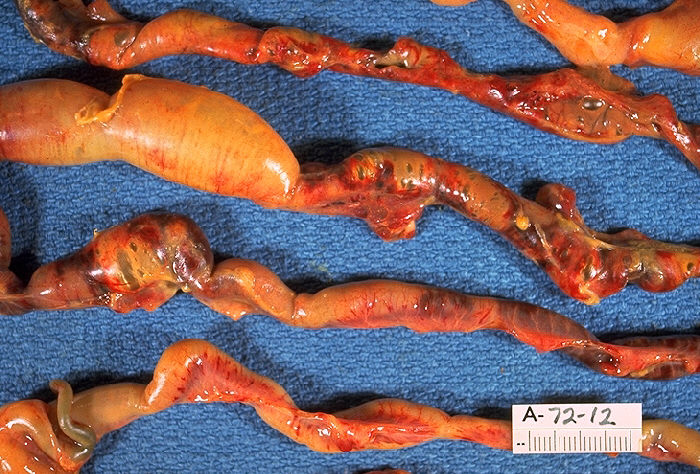
Necrotizing enterocolitis, a potential cause of SBS

Short bowel syndrome (SBS) is the condition in which a patient cannot absorb adequate nutrients because a portion of the small intestine is damaged or absent. SBS commonly affects pediatric patients who have undergone surgery, such as premature infants with necrotizing enterocolitis and infants with gastrointestinal defects such as gastroschisis. In adults, Crohn's disease is a possible cause of SBS. If they are unable to absorb nutrients in the gut, patients must be given parenteral nutrition (PN) intravenously, but long-term PN can be associated with liver failure.

== History ==
The procedure was studied by researchers in Boston utilizing a group of ten young pigs. Five of the pigs underwent removal of 90 percent of the bowel followed by STEP. The other pigs underwent the bowel resection without the STEP procedure, serving as control subjects. STEP was shown to lengthen the bowel from 105.2 ± 7.7 cm to 152.2 ± 8.3 cm.

STEP was first performed on a human patient, a two-year-old who had been born with gastroschisis, in 2003. By 2010, it had been utilized by more than 20 hospitals, mostly in the United States. In addition to its use in treating SBS, STEP has been utilized to treat bacterial overgrowth in a dilated bowel loop and to prevent SBS upon the initial repair of certain types of intestinal atresia.

In 2004, the International Serial Transverse Enteroplasty (STEP) Data Registry was created to serve as an online database to study outcomes following STEP. By 2013, 111 patients had been entered into the database, though 14 had been lost to follow-up. At that time, 11 patients had died and five had received intestinal transplants. 47% had attained enteral autonomy (sufficient bowel function). Pre-STEP bowel length was found to be inversely proportional to the likelihood of transplant or death. Pre-STEP direct bilirubin levels were found to be proportional to the likelihood of transplant or death.

== Procedure ==
In STEP, the bowel is dilated and then partially transected (cut) at certain points, creating a zigzag pattern to the bowel that results in lengthening of the surface area available for digestion.

Longitudinal intestinal lengthening and tapering (LILT), also known as the Bianchi procedure, is a surgical alternative to STEP. LILT and STEP have similar outcomes. With each procedure, more than half of patients gain the ability to absorb sufficient nutrients in the intestine. A single-center study compared STEP and LILT, reporting fewer complications with LILT.
