= Parenteral nutrition =

Intravenous feeding

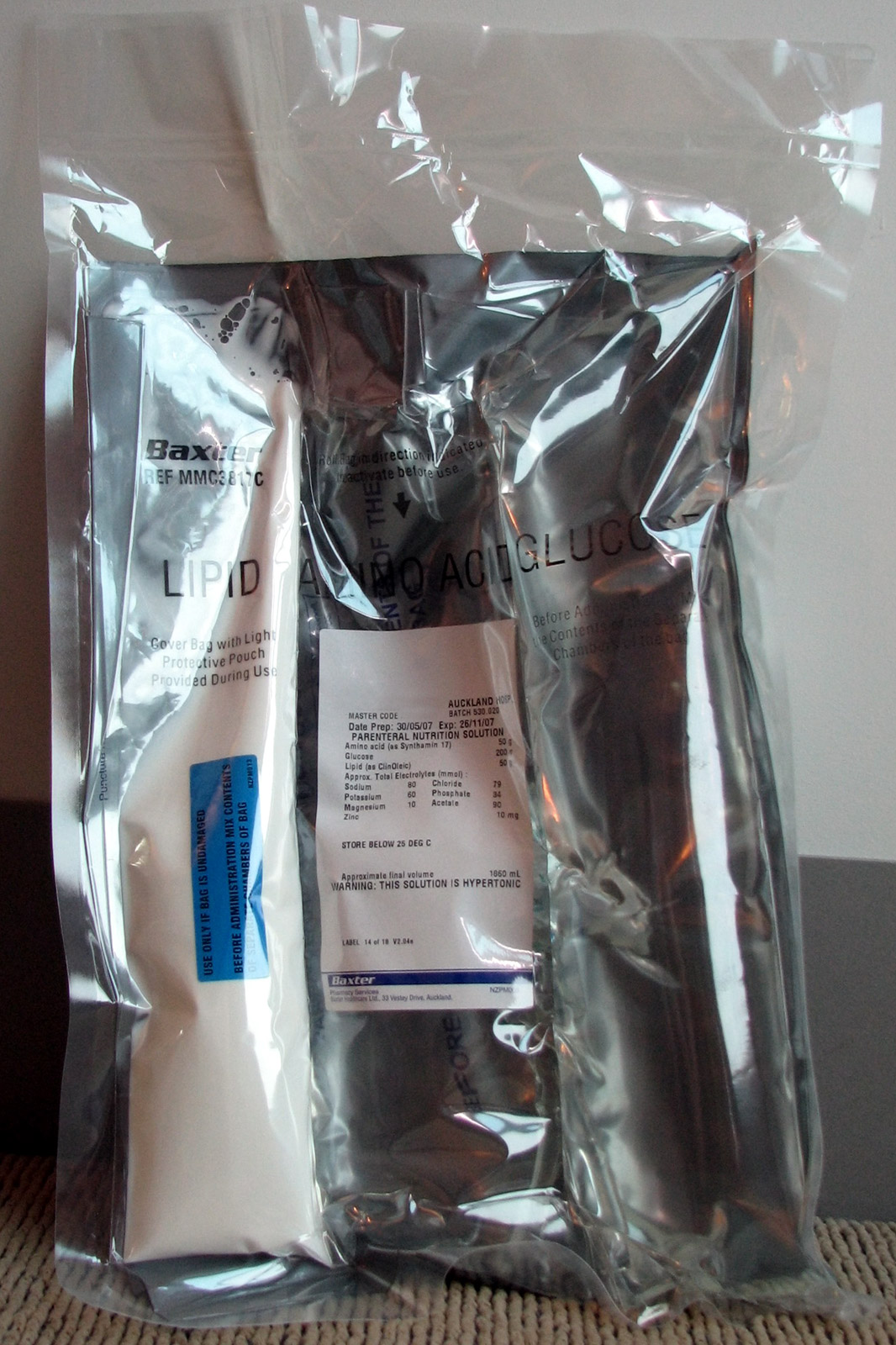
- 3-chamber TPN-formula bag

Parenteral nutrition (PN), or intravenous feeding, is the feeding of nutritional products to a person intravenously, bypassing the usual process of eating and digestion. The products are made by pharmaceutical compounding entities or standard pharmaceutical companies. The person receives a nutritional mix according to a formula including glucose, salts, amino acids, lipids, vitamins, and dietary minerals. It is called total parenteral nutrition (TPN) or total nutrient admixture (TNA) when no significant nutrition is obtained by other routes, and partial parenteral nutrition (PPN) when nutrition is also partially enteric. It is called peripheral parenteral nutrition (PPN) when administered through vein access in a limb rather than through a central vein as in central venous nutrition (CVN).

== Medical uses ==
Total parenteral nutrition (TPN) is provided when the gastrointestinal tract is nonfunctional because of an interruption in its continuity (it is blocked, or has a leak – a fistula) or because its absorptive capacity is impaired. It has been used for comatose patients, although enteral feeding is usually preferable, and less prone to complications. Parenteral nutrition is used to prevent malnutrition in patients who are unable to obtain adequate nutrients by oral or enteral routes. The Society of Critical Care Medicine (SCCM) and American Society for Parenteral and Enteral Nutrition recommends waiting until the seventh day of hospital care to administer parenteral nutrition.

=== Absolute indications for TPN ===
Diseases that would require the use of TPN include:

- Short bowel syndrome
- Small bowel obstruction
- Active gastrointestinal bleeding
- Pseudo-obstruction with complete intolerance to food
- High-output (defined as > 500ml/day) enteric-cutaneous fistulas (unless a feeding tube can be passed distal to the fistula)
- Premature birth (unable to take oral feeds)

=== Gastrointestinal disorders ===
TPN may be the only feasible option for providing nutrition to patients who do not have a functioning gastrointestinal tract or who have disorders requiring complete bowel rest, including bowel obstruction, short bowel syndrome, gastroschisis, gastroparesis, prolonged diarrhea regardless of its cause, very severe Crohn's disease or ulcerative colitis, and certain pediatric GI disorders including congenital GI anomalies and necrotizing enterocolitis.

=== In the geriatric population ===
There are physical, physiological, or mental differences in the geriatric population that could potentially lead to poor nutrient intake that would require them to have nutrition therapy. Geriatric patients are more inclined to have delayed muscle restoration compared to the younger population. Additionally, older patients are observed to have greater cardiac and renal impairment, insulin resistance, and to have deficiencies in vitamins and crucial elements. Patients who require nutrition therapy but have contraindications for or cannot tolerate enteral nutrition are appropriate candidates for parenteral nutrition. In the geriatric population, it is indicated if oral or enteral nutrition is impossible for 3 days or when oral or enteral nutrition is likely insufficient for more than 7 to 10 days. While there are no complications of parenteral nutrition specific to the geriatric population, complications are more prevalent in this population due to increased comorbidities.

=== In cancer ===
Patients who are diagnosed with cancer, whether as outpatient undergoing treatment or hospitalized, are at a greater risk of malnutrition and cachexia. Cancer-related malnutrition can be attributed to the decrease in food intake, increase in the need for energy, and the alteration of metabolism. Patients should be assessed early on in their cancer treatment for any nutritional risk, such as by taking routine weights and BMI. Parenteral nutrition is indicated in cancer patients when it is not possible to access the digestive tract or if the tract is ineffective. In advanced cancer patients, the use of PN should be discussed in context of the risks and benefits, such as if the approximate survival rate is longer than 3 months and if PN would be expected to greatly improve the patients' quality of life.

It is uncertain whether home parenteral nutrition improves survival or quality of life in people with malignant bowel obstruction.

== Duration ==
Short-term PN may be used if a person's digestive system has shut down (for instance by peritonitis), and they are at a low enough weight to cause concerns about nutrition during an extended hospital stay. Long-term PN is occasionally used to treat people suffering the extended consequences of an accident, surgery, or digestive disorder. PN has extended the life of children born with nonexistent or severely deformed organs.

=== Living with TPN ===
Approximately 40,000 people use TPN at home in the United States, and because TPN requires 10–16 hours to be administered, daily life can be affected. Although daily lifestyle can be changed, most patients agree that these changes are better than staying at the hospital. Many different types of pumps exist to limit the time the patient is "hooked up". Usually a backpack pump is used, allowing for mobility. The time required to be connected to the IV is dependent on the situation of each patient; some require once a day, or five days a week.

It is important for patients to avoid as much TPN-related change as possible in their lifestyles. This allows for the best possible mental health situation; constantly being held down can lead to resentment and depression. Physical activity is also highly encouraged, but patients must avoid contact sports (equipment damage) and swimming (infection). Many teens find it difficult to live with TPN due to issues regarding body image and not being able to participate in activities and events.

== Complications ==
TPN fully bypasses the GI tract and normal methods of nutrient absorption. Possible complications, which may be significant, are listed below. Other than those listed below, common complications of TPN include hypophosphatemia, hypokalemia, hyperglycemia, hypercapnia, decreased copper and zinc levels, elevated prothrombin time (if associated with liver injury), hyperchloremic metabolic acidosis and decreased gastrointestinal motility.

=== Infection ===
TPN requires a chronic IV access for the solution to run through, and the most common complication is infection of this catheter. Infection is a common cause of death in these patients, with a mortality rate of approximately 15% per infection, and death usually results from septic shock. When using central venous access, the subclavian (or axillary) vein is preferred due to its ease of access and lowest infectious complications compared to the jugular and femoral vein insertions.

Catheter complications include pneumothorax, accidental arterial puncture, and catheter-related sepsis. The complication rate at the time of insertion should be less than 5%. Catheter-related infections may be minimised by appropriate choice of catheter and insertion technique.

=== Blood clots ===
Chronic IV access leaves a foreign body in the vascular system, and blood clots on this IV line are common. Death can result from pulmonary embolism wherein a clot that starts on the IV line breaks off and travels to the lungs, blocking blood flow.

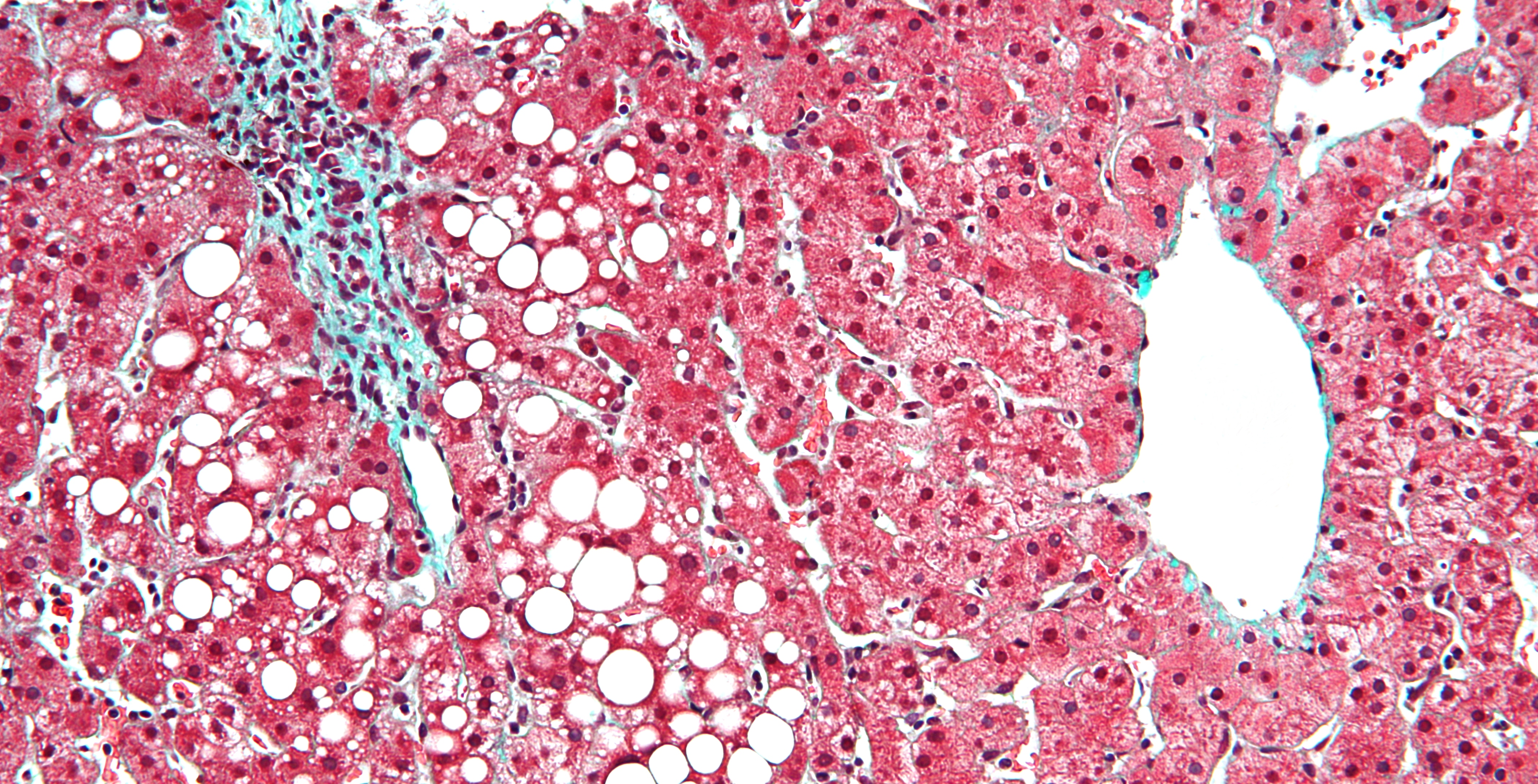
Micrograph of periportal fatty liver as may arise due to TPN. Trichrome stain.

Patients on TPN who have such clots occluding their catheter may receive a thrombolytic flush to dissolve the clots and prevent further complications.

=== Fatty liver and liver failure ===
Fatty liver is usually a more long-term complication of TPN, though over a long enough course it is fairly common. TPN-associated liver disease strikes up to 50% of patients within 5–7 years, correlated with a mortality rate of 2–50%. The onset of this liver disease is the major complication that leads TPN patients to requiring an intestinal transplant.

Intralipid (Fresenius-Kabi), the US standard lipid emulsion for TPN nutrition, contains a 7:1 ratio of n-6/n-3 ratio of polyunsaturated fatty acids (PUFA). By contrast, Omegaven has a 1:8 ratio and showed promise in multiple clinical studies. Therefore, n-3-rich fat may alter the course of parenteral nutrition associated liver disease (PNALD).

=== Hunger ===
Because patients are being fed intravenously, the subject does not physically eat, resulting in intense hunger pangs (pains). The brain uses signals from the mouth (taste and smell), the stomach and gastrointestinal tract (fullness) and blood (nutrient levels) to determine conscious feelings of hunger. In cases of TPN, the taste, smell and physical fullness requirements are not met, and so the patient experiences hunger, although the body is being fully nourished.

Patients who eat food despite the inability can experience a wide range of complications, such as refeeding syndrome.

=== Cholecystitis ===
Total parenteral nutrition increases the risk of acute cholecystitis due to complete disuse of the gastrointestinal tract, which may result in bile stasis in the gallbladder. Other potential hepatobiliary dysfunctions include steatosis, steatohepatitis, cholestasis, and cholelithiasis. Six percent of patients on TPN longer than three weeks and 100% of patients on TPN longer than 13 weeks develop biliary sludge. The formation of sludge is the result of stasis due to lack of enteric stimulation and is not due to changes in bile composition. Gallbladder sludge disappears after four weeks of a normal oral diet. Administration of exogenous cholecystokinin (CCK) or stimulation of endogenous CCK by a periodic pulse of large amounts of amino acids has been shown to help prevent sludge formation. These therapies are not routinely recommended. Such complications are suggested to be the main reason for mortality in people requiring long-term total parenteral nutrition, such as in short bowel syndrome. In newborn infants with short bowel syndrome with less than 10% of expected intestinal length, thereby being dependent upon total parenteral nutrition, five-year survival is approximately 20%.

=== Gut atrophy ===
Infants who are sustained on TPN without food by mouth for prolonged periods are at risk for developing gut atrophy.

=== Hypersensitivity ===
Hypersensitivity is a rarely described but significant complication of parenteral nutrition therapy. First reported in 1965, the incidence of these reactions is speculated to be around one in 1.5 million patients who are provided parenteral nutrition. There is a wide range in how and when these reactions manifest. Cutaneous manifestations are the most common presentation. Hypersensitivity is thought to occur to the individual components of TPN, with the intravenous lipid emulsion being the most frequently implicated component, followed by the multivitamin solution and the amino acid solution.

Medications

Patients who are receiving intravenous parenteral nutrition may also need to receive intravenous medications as well using the same Y-site. It is important to assess the compatibility of the medications with the nutrition components. Incompatibilities can be observed physically through discoloration, phase separation, or precipitation.

=== Metabolic complications ===
Metabolic complications include the refeeding syndrome characterised by hypokalemia, hypophosphatemia and hypomagnesemia. Hyperglycemia is common at the start of therapy, but can be treated with insulin added to the TPN solution. Hypoglycaemia is likely to occur with abrupt cessation of TPN. Liver dysfunction can be limited to a reversible cholestatic jaundice and to fatty infiltration (demonstrated by elevated transaminases). Severe hepatic dysfunction is a rare complication. Overall, patients receiving TPN have a higher rate of infectious complications. This can be related to hyperglycemia.

=== Pregnancy ===
Pregnancy can cause major complications when trying to properly dose the nutrient mixture. Because all of the fetus' nourishment comes from the mother's blood stream, the doctor must properly calculate the dosage of nutrients to meet both recipients' needs and have them in usable forms. Incorrect dosage can lead to many adverse, hard-to-guess effects, such as death, and varying degrees of deformation or other developmental problems.

It is recommended that parenteral nutrition administration begins after a period of natural nutrition so doctors can properly calculate the nutritional needs of the fetus. Otherwise, it should only be administered by a team of highly skilled doctors who can accurately assess the fetus' needs.

== Total parenteral nutrition ==
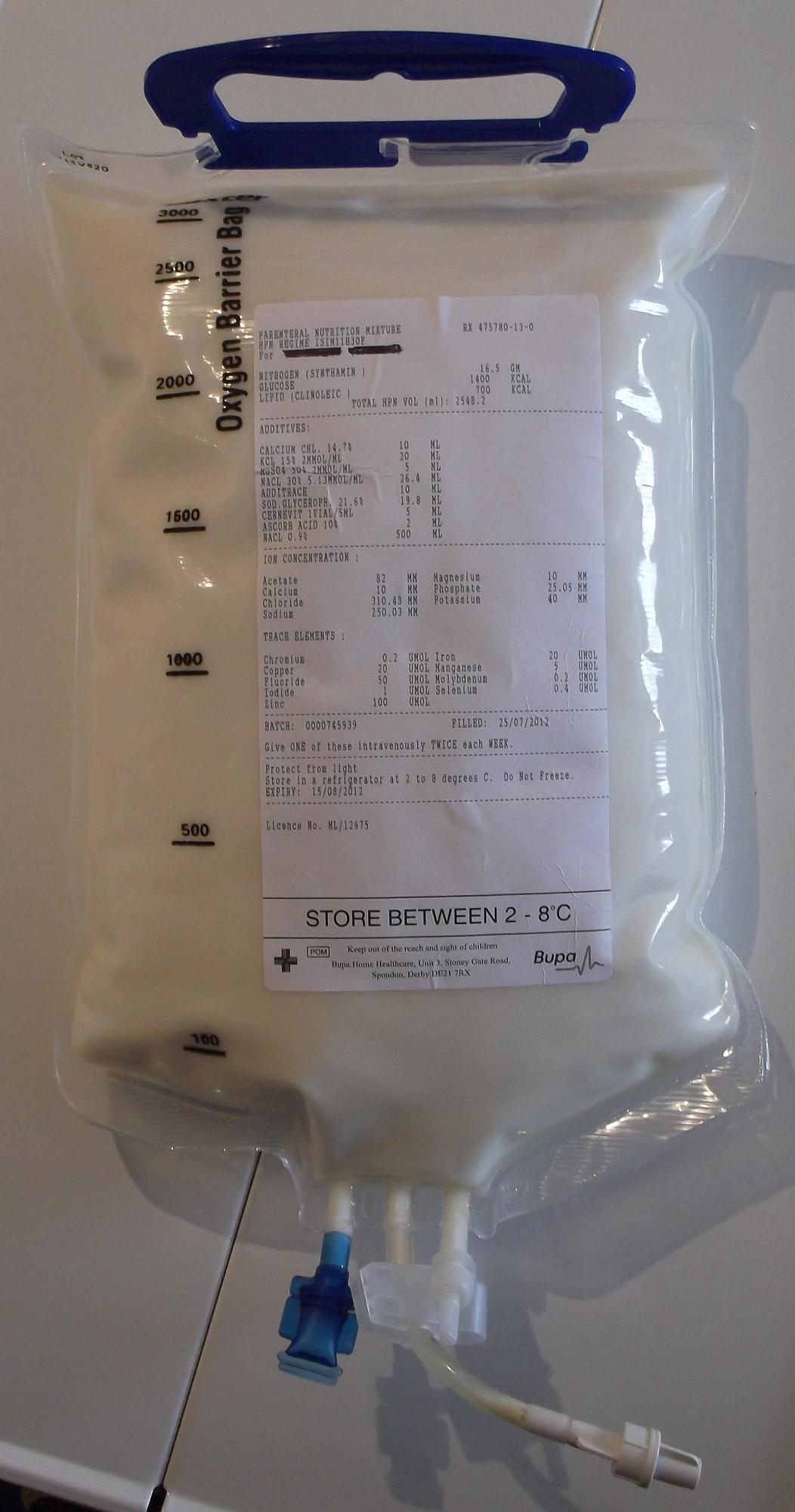
Prescription lipid parenteral nutrition formulation

Solutions for total parenteral nutrition may be customized to individual patient requirements, or standardized solutions may be used. The use of standardized parenteral nutrition solutions is cost-effective and may provide better control of serum electrolytes. Ideally each patient is assessed individually before commencing on parenteral nutrition, and a team consisting of specialised doctors, nurses, clinical pharmacists, and registered dietitians evaluate the patient's individual data and decide what PN formula to use and at what infusion rate. For neonates, specialist formulations are required.

For energy only, intravenous sugar solutions with glucose (dextrose) are generally used. This is not considered to be parenteral nutrition as it does not prevent malnutrition when used on its own. Standardized solutions may also differ between developers. Following are some examples of what compositions they may have. The solution for normal patients may be given both centrally and peripherally.

Examples of total parenteral nutrition solutions
Substance	Normal patient	High stress	Fluid-restricted
Amino acids	85 g	128 g	75 g
Dextrose	250 g	350 g	250 g
Lipids	100 g	100 g	50 g
Na^{+}	150 mEq	155 mEq	80 mEq
K^{+}	80 mEq	80 mEq	40 mEq
Ca^{2+}	360 mg	360 mg	180 mg
Mg^{2+}	240 mg	240 mg	120 mg
Acetate	72 mEq	226 mEq	134 mEq
Cl^{−}	143 mEq	145 mEq	70 mEq
P	310 mg	465 mg	233 mg
MVI-12	10 mL	10 mL	10 mL
Trace elements	5 mL	5 mL	5 mL

== Components ==
=== Prepared solutions ===
Prepared solutions generally consist of water and electrolytes; glucose, amino acids, and lipids; essential vitamins, minerals and trace elements are added or given separately. Previously lipid emulsions were given separately but it is becoming more common for a "three-in-one" solution of glucose, proteins, and lipids to be administered.

=== Added components ===
Individual nutrient components may be added to more precisely adjust the body contents of it. That individual nutrient may, if possible, be infused individually, or it may be injected into a bag of nutrient solution or intravenous fluids (volume expander solution) that is given to the patient.

Administration of individual components may be more hazardous than administration of pre-mixed solutions such as those used in total parenteral nutrition, because the latter are generally already balanced in regard to e.g. osmolarity and ability to infuse peripherally. Incorrect IV administration of concentrated potassium can be lethal, but this is not a danger if the potassium is mixed in TPN solution and diluted.

Vitamins may be added to a bulk premixed nutrient immediately before administration, since the additional vitamins can promote spoilage of stored product. Vitamins can be added in two doses, one fat-soluble, the other water-soluble. There are also single-dose preparations with both fat- and water-soluble vitamins such as Cernevit.

Minerals and trace elements for parenteral nutrition are available in prepared mixtures, such as Addaven.

These additional components in parenteral nutritions, however were subject to stability checks, since they greatly affect the stability of lipid emulsions that serve as the base for these formulations. Studies have shown differences in physical and chemical stabilities of these total parenteral nutrition solutions, which greatly influences pharmaceutical manufacturing of these admixtures.

=== Emulsifier ===
Only a limited number of emulsifiers are commonly regarded as safe to use for parenteral administration, of which the most important is lecithin. Lecithin can be biodegraded and metabolized, since it is an integral part of biological membranes, making it virtually non-toxic. Other emulsifiers can only be excreted via the kidneys, creating a toxic load. The emulsifier of choice for most fat emulsions used for parenteral nutrition is a highly purified egg lecithin, due to its low toxicity and complete integration with cell membranes.

Use of egg-derived emulsifiers is not recommended for people with an egg allergy due to the risk of reaction. In situations where there is no suitable emulsifying agent for a person at risk of developing essential fatty acid deficiency, cooking oils may be spread upon large portions of available skin for supplementation by transdermal absorption.

Another type of fat emulsion Omegaven is being used experimentally within the US primarily in the pediatric population. It is made of fish oil instead of the soybean oil based formulas more widely in use. Research has shown use of Omegaven may reverse and prevent liver disease and cholestasis.

== History ==
Going back more than 350 years, the first landmark description was of general blood circulation by William Harvey in 1628, which formed the anatomical basis for intravenous infusions. Investigations during the following centuries demonstrated solutions containing electrolytes and glucose could be given intravenously. The accumulated knowledge of protein metabolism formed the basis for studies on intravenous nutrition with protein hydrolysates, peptides, and amino acids. Robert Elman's observation in the late 1930s that amino acids in the form of protein hydrolysate could be administered safely was the first major step toward TPN. During the following years, major efforts were made to find methods to prepare infusion solutions with a high energy content and low osmotic pressure. The most realistic alternative seemed to be fat in the form of an emulsion. Many studies of a large number of various fat emulsions were made from the 1920s until the end of the 1950s. However, all of these emulsions caused severe adverse reactions.

The first safe fat emulsion, Intralipid, developed by Prof. Arvid Wretlind of the Karolinska Institute, Sweden, was made available for clinical use in 1962. This was the second major step toward TPN. Vitamins, electrolytes, and trace elements were then included in the fat emulsions and in the solutions of amino acids and glucose. Later in the 1960s, Dr. Stanley Dudrick, who as a surgical resident in the University of Pennsylvania, working in the basic science laboratory of Dr. Jonathan Rhoads, was the first to successfully nourish initially Beagle puppies and subsequently newborn babies with catastrophic gastrointestinal malignancies. Dudrick collaborated with Dr. Willmore and Dr. Vars to complete the work necessary to make this nutritional technique safe and successful. He showed that a central venous catheter could be used to administer the infusion fluid intravenously.

Presented with Judy Ellis Taylor in September 1970 who had all her bowels surgically removed due to gangrene, gastroenterologist and University of Toronto clinical researcher Dr. Khursheed Nowrojee Jeejeebhoy, who'd been working with short-term hyperalimentation (as TPN was then called) at Toronto General Hospital, determined to create complete nutrition and send her home to live on it. Taylor was the first person in the world to live without eating, receiving no calories or nutrition by mouth, unlike previous patients, and to live at home and care for her family. As a result, Jeejeebhoy was able to demonstrate a person could live at home with good quality of life on TPN, that fatty liver develops as a result of carbohydrates not fat, discover that chromium is involved in the development of diabetes, investigate the role of zinc, and study the effect of intravenous Vitamin D on the development of osteomalacia and parenteral nutrition-induced metabolic bone disease, among other discoveries. Prof. Wretlind called him, "the father of complete long-term parenteral nutrition in man." And in the 2009 biography in the journal Gastroenterology, the author Myron Lewis dubbed him, "Mr. Parenteral Nutrition."

In 2019 the UK experienced a severe shortage of TPN bags due to safety restrictions at the sole manufacturing site, operated by Calea. The National Health Service described the situation as an emergency.

== See also ==
- Feeding tube
- Hickman line
- Intradialytic parenteral nutrition
- Intravenous therapy
- Nothing by mouth
- Intralipid
