= Vitamin D and Omega-3 Trial =

Clinical trial

Vitamin D and Omega-3 Trial (VITAL) was a clinical trial designed to investigate the use of daily dietary supplements of vitamin D and fish oil.

== Sponsor ==
The sponsor of the study was Brigham and Women's Hospital, collaborating with The National Cancer Institute, National Heart, Lung, and Blood Institute, Office of Dietary Supplements, National Institute of Neurological Disorders and Stroke, National Center for Complementary and Integrative Health, Pharmavite LLC, Pronova BioPharma and BASF.

The studied aimed to enroll 20,000 participants (women 55 or over, men 50 or over) who were randomized into one of four groups:

- daily vitamin D (2000 IU) and fish oil (1 g);
- daily vitamin D and fish-oil placebo;
- daily vitamin-D placebo and fish oil;
- daily vitamin-D placebo and fish-oil placebo.

Participants answered annual questionnaires to determine effects the risks of developing cancer, heart disease, stroke, osteoporosis, diabetes, memory loss and depression.

== Outcome ==
The outcome of this study was: "The results of this trial indicate that supplementation with either n–3 fatty acid at a dose of 1 g/day or vitamin D3 at a dose of 2000 IU/day was not effective for primary prevention of CV or cancer events among healthy middle-aged men and women over 5 years of follow-up. There was also no difference in progression/development of CKD among patients with type 2 diabetes. This is one of the largest trials on this topic. The finding of a lower MI risk with n–3 fatty acid is hypothesis generating and deserves further study. The authors also noted some interaction with baseline fish consumption, with greater CV benefit observed among participants who had low fish intake at baseline."

VITAL-DEP (Vitamin D and Omega-3 Trial-Depression Endpoint Prevention), an ancillary study to VITAL, found that omega-3 supplementation significantly increased the risk of depression compared to placebo.
