= Teduglutide =

Chemical compound

Clinical data
- Trade names: Revestive, Gattex
- AHFS/Drugs.com: Monograph
- MedlinePlus: a613019
- License data: US DailyMed: Teduglutide
- Routes of administration: Subcutaneous injection
- ATC code: A16AX08 (WHO)

Legal status
- Legal status: AU: S4 (Prescription only); CA: ℞-only; US: ℞-only; EU: Rx-only

Pharmacokinetic data
- Bioavailability: 88%
- Metabolism: Proteolysis
- Elimination half-life: 2h

Identifiers
- IUPAC name: L-histidylglycyl-L-α-aspartylglycyl-L-seryl-L-phenylalanyl-L-seryl-L-α-aspartyl-L-α-glutamyl-L-methionyl-L-asparaginyl-L-threonyl-L-isoleucyl-L-leucyl-L-α-aspartyl-L-asparaginyl-L-leucyl-L-alanyl-L-alanyl-L-arginyl-L-α-aspartyl-L-phenylalanyl-L-isoleucyl-L-asparaginyl-L-tryptophyl-L-leucyl-L-isoleucyl-L-glutaminyl-L-threonyl-L-lysyl-L-isoleucyl-L-threonyl-L-aspartic acid
- CAS Number: 197922-42-2
- PubChem CID: 16139605
- IUPHAR/BPS: 7049
- ChemSpider: 17296109
- UNII: 7M19191IKG
- KEGG: D06053
- ChEBI: CHEBI:72305

Chemical and physical data
- Formula: C_{164}H_{252}N_{44}O_{55}S
- Molar mass: 3752.13 g·mol^{−1}
- 3D model (JSmol): Interactive image
- SMILES: CC[C@H](C)[C@H](NC(=O)[C@H](CC(C)C)NC(=O)[C@H](Cc1c[nH]c2ccccc12)NC(=O)[C@H](CC(N)=O)NC(=O)[C@@H](NC(=O)[C@H](Cc1ccccc1)NC(=O)[C@H](CC(O)=O)NC(=O)[C@H](CCCNC(N)=N)NC(=O)[C@H](C)NC(=O)[C@H](C)NC(=O)[C@H](CC(C)C)NC(=O)[C@H](CC(N)=O)NC(=O)[C@H](CC(O)=O)NC(=O)[C@H](CC(C)C)NC(=O)[C@@H](NC(=O)[C@@H](NC(=O)[C@H](CC(N)=O)NC(=O)[C@H](CCSC)NC(=O)[C@H](CCC(O)=O)NC(=O)[C@H](CC(O)=O)NC(=O)[C@H](CO)NC(=O)[C@H](Cc1ccccc1)NC(=O)[C@H](CO)NC(=O)CNC(=O)[C@H](CC(O)=O)NC(=O)CNC(=O)[C@@H](N)Cc1cnc[nH]1)[C@@H](C)O)[C@@H](C)CC)[C@@H](C)CC)C(=O)N[C@@H](CCC(N)=O)C(=O)N[C@@H]([C@@H](C)O)C(=O)N[C@@H](CCCCN)C(=O)N[C@@H]([C@@H](C)CC)C(=O)N[C@@H]([C@@H](C)O)C(=O)N[C@@H](CC(O)=O)C(O)=O
- InChI: InChI=1S/C164H252N44O55S/c1-21-77(11)126(156(255)187-95(44-46-114(167)214)141(240)206-130(83(17)211)160(259)186-93(42-33-34-49-165)140(239)202-129(80(14)24-4)159(258)208-131(84(18)212)161(260)200-111(163(262)263)66-125(230)231)203-151(250)100(54-76(9)10)189-145(244)103(57-88-67-175-92-41-32-31-40-90(88)92)192-147(246)105(60-116(169)216)199-157(256)127(78(12)22-2)204-152(251)102(56-87-38-29-26-30-39-87)190-149(248)109(64-123(226)227)195-137(236)94(43-35-50-174-164(171)172)183-134(233)82(16)179-133(232)81(15)180-142(241)98(52-74(5)6)188-146(245)104(59-115(168)215)194-150(249)110(65-124(228)229)196-143(242)99(53-75(7)8)198-158(257)128(79(13)23-3)205-162(261)132(85(19)213)207-153(252)106(61-117(170)217)193-139(238)97(48-51-264-20)185-138(237)96(45-47-120(220)221)184-148(247)108(63-122(224)225)197-155(254)113(72-210)201-144(243)101(55-86-36-27-25-28-37-86)191-154(253)112(71-209)182-119(219)70-177-136(235)107(62-121(222)223)181-118(218)69-176-135(234)91(166)58-89-68-173-73-178-89/h25-32,36-41,67-68,73-85,91,93-113,126-132,175,209-213H,21-24,33-35,42-66,69-72,165-166H2,1-20H3,(H2,167,214)(H2,168,215)(H2,169,216)(H2,170,217)(H,173,178)(H,176,234)(H,177,235)(H,179,232)(H,180,241)(H,181,218)(H,182,219)(H,183,233)(H,184,247)(H,185,237)(H,186,259)(H,187,255)(H,188,245)(H,189,244)(H,190,248)(H,191,253)(H,192,246)(H,193,238)(H,194,249)(H,195,236)(H,196,242)(H,197,254)(H,198,257)(H,199,256)(H,200,260)(H,201,243)(H,202,239)(H,203,250)(H,204,251)(H,205,261)(H,206,240)(H,207,252)(H,208,258)(H,220,221)(H,222,223)(H,224,225)(H,226,227)(H,228,229)(H,230,231)(H,262,263)(H4,171,172,174)/t77-,78-,79-,80-,81-,82-,83+,84+,85+,91-,93-,94-,95-,96-,97-,98-,99-,100-,101-,102-,103-,104-,105-,106-,107-,108-,109-,110-,111-,112-,113-,126-,127-,128-,129-,130-,131-,132-/m0/s1; Key:CILIXQOJUNDIDU-ASQIGDHWSA-N

Teduglutide, sold under the brand names Revestive (EU) and Gattex (US), is a 33-membered polypeptide and glucagon-like peptide-2 (GLP-2) analog that is used for the treatment of short bowel syndrome. It works by promoting mucosal growth and possibly restoring gastric emptying and secretion. It was approved in both the European Union and the United States in 2012.

Teduglutide is available as a generic medication.

== Medical uses ==
Up to a certain point, the gut can adapt to partial resections that result in short bowel syndrome. Still, parenteral substitution of water, minerals and vitamins (depending on which part of the gut has been removed) is often necessary. Teduglutide may reduce or shorten the necessity of such infusions by improving the intestinal mucosa and possibly by other mechanisms.

== Adverse effects ==
Common adverse effects in clinical studies included abdominal discomfort (49% of patients), respiratory infections (28%), nausea (27%) and vomiting (14%), local reactions at the injection site (21%), and headache (17%).

== Chemistry and mechanism of action ==
Teduglutide differs from natural GLP-2 by a single amino acid: an alanine is replaced with a glycine. This blocks breaking down of the molecule by dipeptidyl peptidase and increases its half-life from seven minutes (GLP-2) to about two hours, while retaining its biological actions. These include maintenance of the intestinal mucosa, increasing intestinal blood flow, reducing gastrointestinal motility and secretion of gastric acid.

== Society and culture ==
=== Legal status ===
It was approved in both the European Union (brand name Revestive) and the United States (brand name Gattex) in 2012. It was granted orphan drug designation by the European Medicines Agency (EMA).
