= Glucagon-like peptide-2 =

Peptide hormone in humans

GCG

Identifiers
- Aliases: GCG, GLP1, glucagon, GRPP, GLP-1, GLP2
- External IDs: OMIM: 138030; MGI: 95674; GeneCards: GCG
Available structures
PDB	Ortholog search: PDBe RCSB
PDB	List of PDB id codes 1BH0, 1NAU, 2G49, 2M5P, 2M5Q,%%s4ZGM, 4APD, 3IOL, 1D0R,%%s2L64, 2L63

Gene location (Human)
Chr.	Chromosome 2 (human)
Band	2q24.2	Start	162,142,882 bp
Band	2q24.2	End	162,152,404 bp

Gene location (Mouse)
Chr.	Chromosome 2 (mouse)
Band	2 C1.3|2 35.85 cM	Start	62,304,874 bp
Band	2 C1.3|2 35.85 cM	End	62,313,994 bp
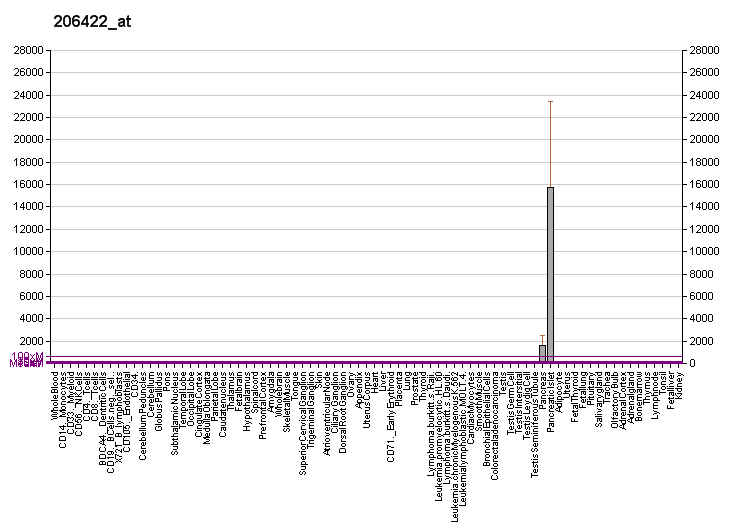
RNA expression pattern
Bgee	Human / Mouse (ortholog); Top expressed in: beta cell; body of pancreas; rectum; mucosa of sigmoid colon; mucosa of ileum; testicle; mucosa of transverse colon; epithelium of colon; jejunal mucosa; appendix / Top expressed in: islet of Langerhans; crypt of lieberkuhn of small intestine; ileum; large intestine; colon; lens; Paneth cell; left colon; jejunum; epithelium of small intestine; More reference expression data
BioGPS	More reference expression data
Gene ontology
Molecular function	protein binding; identical protein binding; hormone activity; glucagon receptor binding; signaling receptor binding
Cellular component	cytoplasm; endoplasmic reticulum lumen; extracellular region; secretory granule lumen; extracellular space
Biological process	negative regulation of execution phase of apoptosis; G protein-coupled receptor signaling pathway; regulation of insulin secretion; cellular response to glucagon stimulus; positive regulation of peptidyl-serine phosphorylation; positive regulation of calcium ion import; positive regulation of histone H3-K4 methylation; positive regulation of peptidyl-threonine phosphorylation; feeding behavior; positive regulation of ERK1 and ERK2 cascade; positive regulation of protein binding; cell population proliferation; signal transduction; positive regulation of protein kinase activity; adenylate cyclase-modulating G protein-coupled receptor signaling pathway; protein kinase A signaling; positive regulation of insulin secretion involved in cellular response to glucose stimulus; response to starvation; negative regulation of apoptotic process; regulation of signaling receptor activity; adenylate cyclase-activating G protein-coupled receptor signaling pathway
Sources:Amigo / QuickGO
Orthologs
Databases	NCBI: entry; OMA: entry
Species	Human	Mouse
Entrez	2641	14526
Ensembl	ENSG00000115263	ENSMUSG00000000394
UniProt	P01275	P55095
RefSeq (mRNA)	NM_002054	NM_008100
RefSeq (protein)	NP_002045	NP_032126
Location (UCSC)	Chr 2: 162.14 – 162.15 Mb	Chr 2: 62.3 – 62.31 Mb
PubMed search
- Wikidata
View/Edit Human	View/Edit Mouse

Glucagon-like peptide-2 (GLP-2) is a peptide hormone that in humans is encoded by the gene GCG. More precisely, proglucagon is produced from GCG, which can be cut by enzymes to produce a number of active hormones such as glucagon, GLP-1, or GLP-2, depending on the tissue. GLP-2 (and GLP-1) in particular are produced and secreted by the intestines with the help of the enzyme PCSK1. GLP-2 then signals to the intestines, inducing intestinal growth and increasing the height of intestinal villi.

GLP-2 is produced by the intestinal endocrine L cell and by various neurons in the central nervous system. Intestinal GLP-2 is co-secreted along with GLP-1 upon nutrient ingestion.

When externally administered, GLP-2 produces a number of effects in humans and rodents, including intestinal growth, enhancement of intestinal function, reduction in bone breakdown and neuroprotection. GLP-2 may act in an endocrine fashion to link intestinal growth and metabolism with nutrient intake. GLP-2 and related analogs (such as Teduglutide) may be treatments for short bowel syndrome, Crohn's disease, osteoporosis and as adjuvant therapy during cancer chemotherapy.

GLP-2 has an antidepressant effect in a mouse model of depression when delivered via intracerebroventricular injection. However, a GLP-2 derivative (PAS-CPP-GLP-2) was shown to be efficiently delivered to the brain intranasally, with similar efficacy.

== Sequence ==
GLP-2 is a 33 amino acid peptide with sequence HADGSFSDEMNTILDNLAARDFINWLIQTKITD in humans (see Proteinogenic amino acid).

== See also ==
- Glucagon-like peptide 2 receptor
