= Lipid emulsion =

Emulsion of fat for human intravenous use

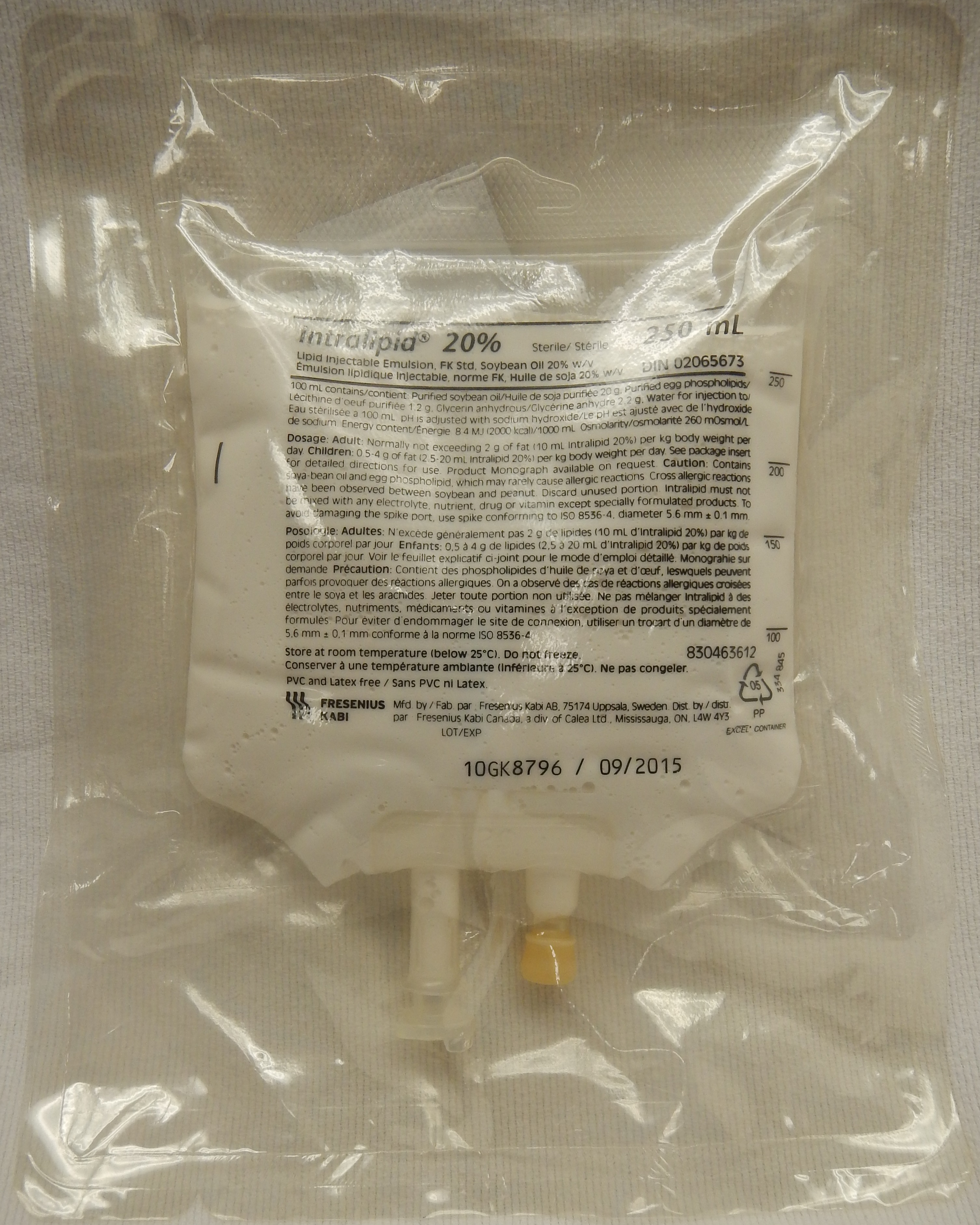
A lipid emulsion (intralipid) 20%

Lipid emulsion or fat emulsion refers to an emulsion of fat for human intravenous use, to administer nutrients to critically-ill patients that cannot consume food. It is often referred to by the brand name of the most commonly used version, Intralipid, which is an emulsion containing soybean oil, egg phospholipids and glycerin, and is available in 10%, 20% and 30% concentrations. The 30% concentration is not approved for direct intravenous infusion, but should be mixed with amino acids and dextrose as part of a total nutrient admixture.

== Medical uses ==
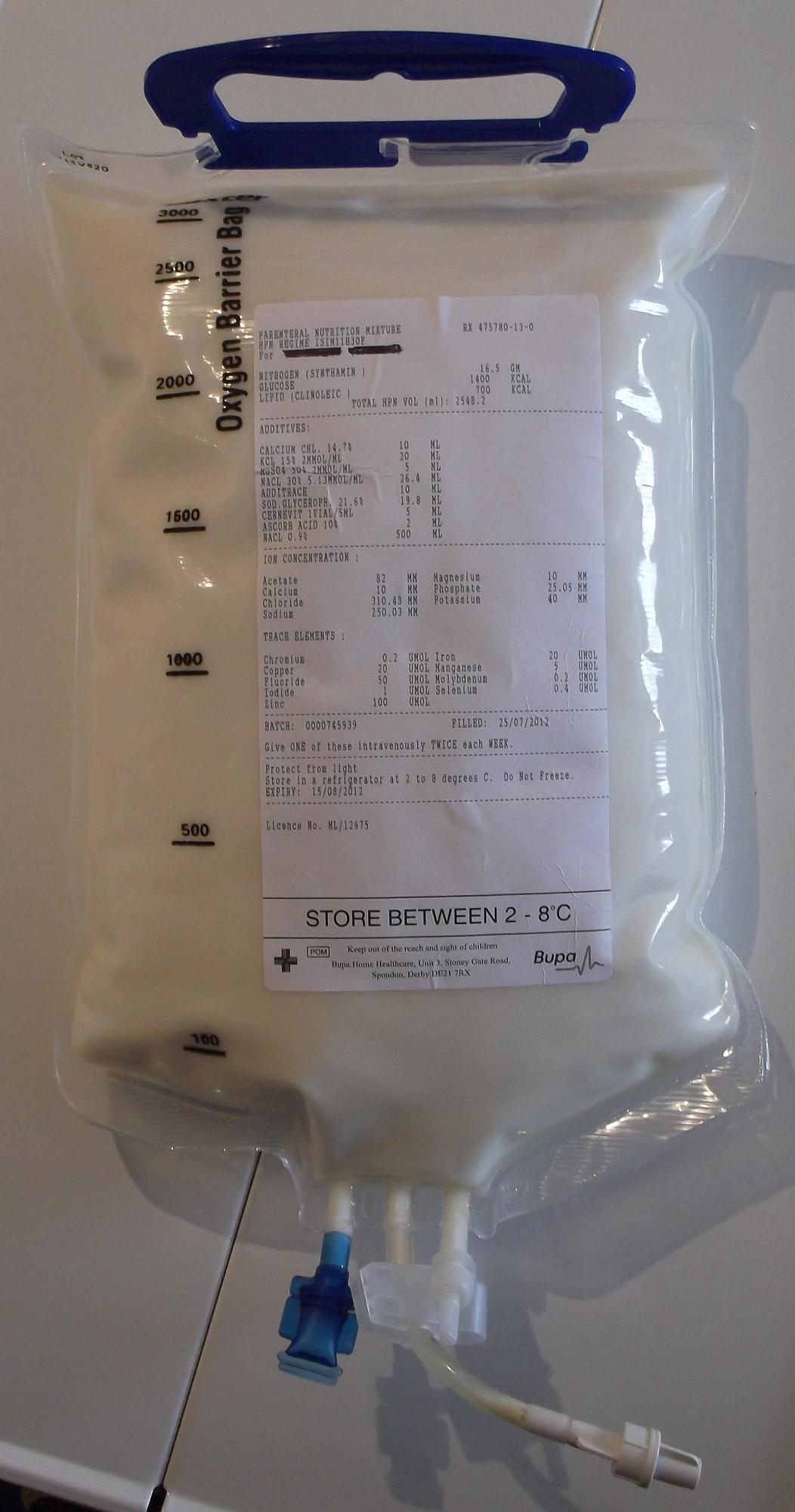
Prescription lipid parenteral nutrition formulation

=== Nutrition ===
Intralipid and other balanced lipid emulsions provide essential fatty acids, linoleic acid (LA), an omega-6 fatty acid, alpha-linolenic acid (ALA), an omega-3 fatty acid. The emulsion is used as a component of intravenous nutrition for people who are unable to get nutrition via an oral diet. These nutrients are combined with the intention of administering parenteral nutrition, where nutrients are delivered in an alternative pathway other than the gastrointestinal tract.

=== Local anaesthetic toxicity ===
Lipid emulsions are effective in treating experimental models of severe cardiotoxicity from intravenous overdose of local anaesthetic drugs such as bupivacaine.

They have been effective in people unresponsive to the usual resuscitation methods. They have subsequently been used off-label in the treatment of overdose from other fat-soluble medications.

=== Vehicle for other medications ===
Propofol is dissolved in a lipid emulsion for intravenous use. Sometimes etomidate (the usual vehicle for etomidate is propylene glycol) is supplied using a lipid emulsion as a vehicle. The possibility of lipid emulsions as an alternative drug delivery medium is under works.

== History ==
Intravenous lipid emulsions have been used experimentally since at least the 19th century. An early product marketed in 1957 under the name Lipomul was briefly used in the United States but was subsequently withdrawn due to side effects. Intralipid was invented by the Swedish physician and nutrition researcher Arvid Wretlind, and was approved for clinical use in Sweden in 1962. In the United States, the Food and Drug Administration initially declined to approve the product due to prior experience with another fat emulsion. It was approved in the United States in 1972.

== Research ==
Intralipid is also widely used in optical experiments to simulate the scattering properties of biological tissues. Solutions of appropriate concentrations of intralipid can be prepared that closely mimic the response of human or animal tissue to light at wavelengths in the red and infrared ranges where tissue is highly scattering but has a rather low absorption coefficient.

=== Cardioprotective agent ===
Intralipid is currently being studied for its potential use as a cardioprotective agent, specifically as a treatment for ischemic reperfusion injury. The rapid return of myocardial blood supply is critical in order to save the ischemic heart, but it also has the potential to create injury due to oxidative damage (via reactive oxygen species) and calcium overload.

The mitochondrial permeability transition pore (mPTP) is normally closed during ischemia, but calcium overload and increased reactive oxygen species (ROS) with reperfusion open mPTP allowing hydrogen ions to flow from the mitochondrial matrix into the cytosol. The hydrogen flux disrupts the mitochondrial membrane potential and results in mitochondrial swelling, outer membrane rupture, and the release of pro-apoptotic factors. These changes impair mitochondrial energy production and drive cardiac myocyte apoptosis.

Intralipid (5mL/kg) provided five minutes before reperfusion delays the opening of mPTP in vivo rat models, making it a potential cardioprotective agent Lou et al. (2014) found that the cardioprotection aspect of Intralipid is initiated by the accumulation of acylcarnitines in the mitochondria and involves inhibition of the electron transport chain, an increase in ROS production during early (3 min) reperfusion, and activation of the reperfusion injury salvage kinase pathway (RISK). The mitochondrial accumulation of acylcarnitines (primarily palmitoyl-carnitine) inhibits the electron transport chain at complex IV, generating protective ROS. The effects of ROS are both "site" and "time" sensitive, meaning that both will ultimately determine whether the ROS are beneficial or detrimental. The generated ROS, which are formed from electrons leaking from the electron transport chain of the mitochondria, first act directly on mPTP to limit opening. ROS then activate signalling pathways that act on the mitochondria to decrease mPTP opening and mediate protection. Activation of the RISK pathway by ROS increases the phosphorylation of other pathways, such as phosphatidylinositol 3-kinase/Akt and extracellular-regulated kinase (ERK) pathways, both of which are found in pools localized at the mitochondria. The Akt and ERK pathways converge to alter glycogen synthase kinase-3 beta (GSK-3β) activity. Specifically, Akt and ERK phosphorylate GSK-3β, inactivating the enzyme, and inhibiting the opening of mPTP. The mechanism by which GSK-3β inhibits the opening of the mPTP is controversial. Nishihara et al. (2007) proposed that it is achieved through interaction of GSK-3β with ANT subunit of mPTP, inhibiting the Cyp-D–ANT interaction, resulting in the inability of the mPTP to open.

In a study by Rahman et al. (2011) Intralipid-treated rat hearts were found to required more calcium to open mPTP during ischemia-reperfusion. The cardiomyocytes are therefore, better able to tolerate the calcium overload, and increase the threshold for opening of the mPTP with the addition of Intralipid.
