= Intradialytic parenteral nutrition =

- Specialty: Nephrology

Intradialytic parenteral nutrition (IDPN) is a nutritional support therapy (medical nutrition therapy) for people on hemodialysis who have a difficult time maintaining adequate nutrition. It is administered directly into the bloodstream of patients with chronic kidney disease (CKD) in an effort to decrease the associated morbidity and mortality experienced in patients with kidney failure. IDPN contains protein (amino acids), carbohydrates (dextrose), and fats (lipids) in an attempt to meet a patient's weekly nutritional needs. Solutions can be individualized for each patient based on weight, needs, medical history and enteral intake.

== History ==
Prior to the development of intradialytic parenteral nutrition in the late 20th century, nutritional management of patients receiving dialysis primarily relied on dietary counselling, liberalized renal diets, and oral nutritional supplements; however, protein–energy wasting (PEW) remained common among patients undergoing maintenance hemodialysis.

Efforts to supplement nutritional intake by providing nutrients during the dialysis procedure were attempted. As a result, IDPN became an established therapy to threat malnourished CKD stage 5 dialysis patients in the early 1990s. Generally, the patients received a set formulation containing standard amounts of dextrose, amino acids and lipids regardless of the patient's weight, dialysis time, and complicating co-morbid conditions.

== New approach to IDPN therapy ==
To address specific nutritional needs of individual patients, several providers of IDPN therapy developed formulations that take clinical variables into account in order to best fit the patient's individual needs and condition. Specific formulations address distinct differences between nutritional needs of those patients who exhibit protein malnutrition and those patients who exhibit calorie malnutrition.

== See also ==
- Nutrition
- Clinical nutrition
