= Necrotizing enterocolitis =

Intestinal disease affecting infants

- Specialty: Pediatrics, gastroenterology, neonatology
- Symptoms: Poor feeding, bloating, decreased activity, vomiting of bile
- Complications: Short-gut syndrome, intestinal strictures, developmental delay
- Causes: Unclear
- Risk factors: Preterm birth, congenital heart disease, birth asphyxia, exchange transfusion, prolonged rupture of membranes
- Differential diagnosis: Sepsis, anal fissure, infectious enterocolitis, Hirschsprung disease
- Prevention: Breast milk, probiotics.
- Treatment: Bowel rest, nasogastric tube, antibiotics, surgery
- Prognosis: Risk of death 25%

Necrotizing enterocolitis (NEC) is an intestinal disease that affects premature or very low birth weight infants. It is characterized by the permeability of the neonatal bowel wall to bacteria with associated inflammation and ischemia. Symptoms may include poor feeding, bloating, decreased activity, blood in the stool, vomiting of bile, multi-organ failure, and potentially death.

The exact cause is unclear. However, several risk factors have been identified. Consistently described risk factors include formula feeding, intestinal dysbiosis, low birth weight, and prematurity. Other risk factors potentially implicated include congenital heart disease, birth asphyxia, exchange transfusion, and prelabor rupture of membranes. The underlying mechanism is believed to involve a combination of poor blood flow and infection of the intestines. Diagnosis is based on symptoms and confirmed with medical imaging.

Maternal factors such as chorioamnionitis, cocaine abuse, intrauterine growth restriction, intrahepatic cholestasis during pregnancy, increased body mass index, lack of prenatal steroids, mode of delivery, placental abruption, pre-eclampsia, and smoking have not been consistently implicated with the development of NEC.

Prevention includes the use of breast milk and probiotics. Treatment includes bowel rest, orogastric tube, intravenous fluids, and intravenous antibiotics. Surgery is required in those who have free air in the abdomen. A number of other supportive measures may also be required. Complications may include short-gut syndrome, intestinal strictures, or developmental delay.

About 7% of those who are born prematurely develop NEC; however the odds of an infant developing this illness is directly related to the intensive care unit they are placed in. Onset is typically in the first four weeks of life. Among those affected, about 25% die. The sexes are affected with equal frequency. The condition was first described between 1888 and 1891.

== Signs and symptoms ==
The condition is typically seen in premature infants, and the timing of its onset is generally inversely proportional to the gestational age of the baby at birth (i.e., the earlier a baby is born, the later signs of NEC are typically seen).

Initial symptoms include feeding intolerance and failure to thrive, increased gastric residuals, abdominal distension, and bloody stools. Symptoms may progress rapidly to abdominal discoloration with intestinal perforation and peritonitis and systemic hypotension requiring intensive medical support.

== Cause ==
The exact cause is unclear. Several risk factors have been implicated:

=== Main risk factors ===
- Low birth weight
- Prematurity
- Formula feeding
- Intestinal dysbiosis

=== Other risk factors ===
- Acute hypoxia
- Antibiotic exposure
- Blood transfusions
- Cardiac anomalies
- Neonatal anemia
- Poor intestinal perfusion
- Prolonged use of indomethacin for patent ductus arteriosus closure

=== Maternal factors ===
- Acid-suppressing medications
- Chorioamnionitis
- Cocaine abuse
- In utero growth restriction
- Increased body mass index
- Intrahepatic cholestasis during pregnancy
- Lack of prenatal steroids
- Mode of delivery
- Placental abruption
- Pre-eclampsia
- Smoking

== Diagnosis ==
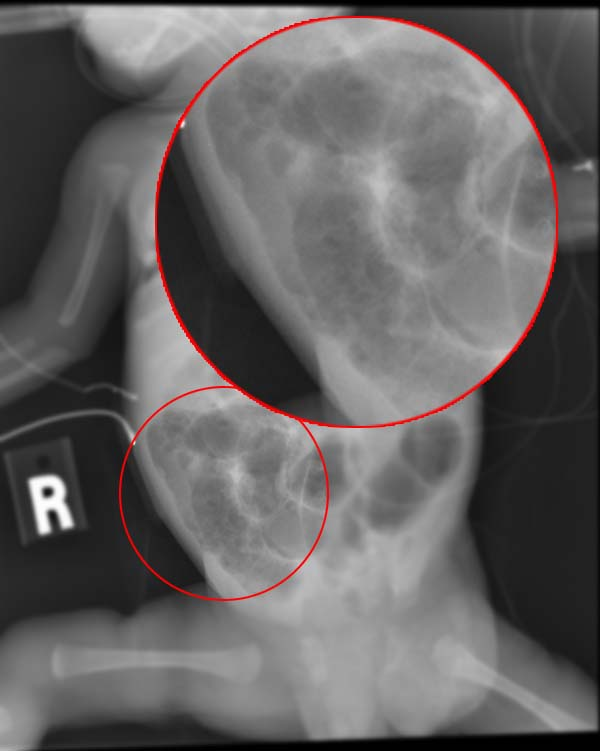
Radiograph of a baby with necrotizing enterocolitis

Diagnosis is usually suspected clinically, but often requires the aid of diagnostic imaging, most commonly radiography, which can show the intestines and may show areas with dead tissue or a bowel perforation. Specific radiographic signs of NEC are associated with specific Bell's stages of the disease:

- Bell's stage 1 (suspected disease):
  - Mild systemic disease (apnea, lethargy, slowed heart rate, temperature instability)
  - Mild intestinal signs (abdominal distention, increased gastric residuals, bloody stools)
  - Nonspecific or normal radiological signs
- Bell's stage 2 (definite disease):
  - Mild to moderate systemic signs
  - Additional intestinal signs (absent bowel sounds, abdominal tenderness)
  - Specific radiologic signs (pneumatosis intestinalis or portal venous gas)
  - Laboratory changes (metabolic acidosis, too few platelets in the bloodstream)
- Bell's stage 3 (advanced disease):
  - Severe systemic illness (low blood pressure)
  - Additional intestinal signs (striking abdominal distention, peritonitis)
  - Severe radiologic signs (pneumoperitoneum)
  - Additional laboratory changes (metabolic and respiratory acidosis, disseminated intravascular coagulation)

Ultrasonography has proven to be useful, as it may detect signs and complications of NEC before they are evident on radiographs, specifically in cases that involve a paucity of bowel gas, a gasless abdomen, or a sentinel loop. Diagnosis is ultimately made in 5–10% of very-low-birth-weight infants (<1,500g).

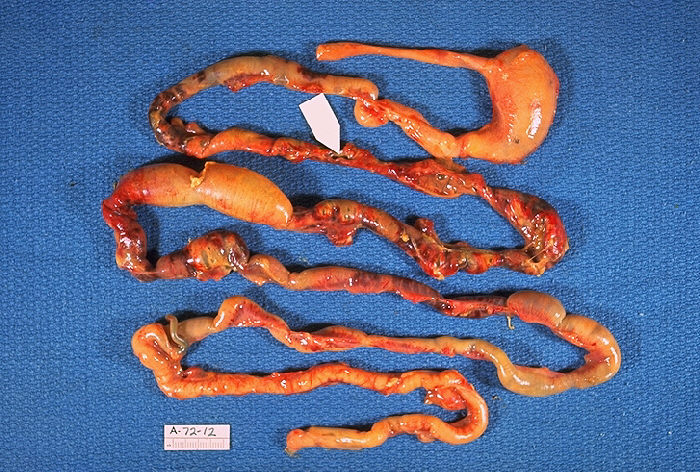
Esophagus, stomach and intestines of affected infant showing intestinal necrosis, pneumatosis intestinalis, and intestinal perforation (arrow) (autopsy specimen)

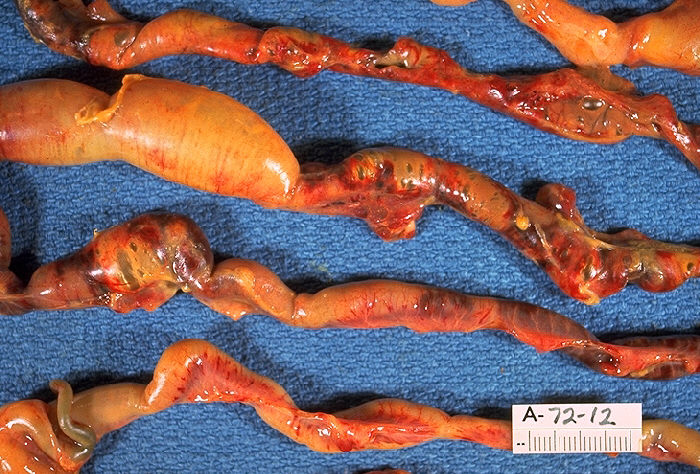
Close-up of intestine showing extensive necrosis (autopsy specimen)

Diagnosis of NEC is more challenging in premature infants, due to inexplicit symptoms and radiographic signs. The most preterm infant is at highest risk of developing NEC.

== Prevention ==
Prevention includes the use of breast milk and probiotics. A 2012 policy by the American Academy of Pediatrics recommended feeding preterm infants human milk, finding "significant short- and long-term beneficial effects," including reducing the rate of NEC by a factor of one-half to three-quarters.

Small amounts of oral feeds of human milk starting as soon as possible, while the infant is being primarily fed intravenously, primes the immature gut to mature and become ready to receive greater intake by mouth. Human milk from a milk bank or donor can be used if mother's milk is unavailable. The gut mucosal cells do not get enough nourishment from arterial blood supply to stay healthy, especially in very premature infants, where the blood supply is limited due to immature development of the capillaries, so nutrients from the lumen of the gut are needed.

Towards understanding intervention with human milk, experts have noted cow's and human milk differ in their immunoglobular and glycan compositions. Due to their relative ease of production, human milk oligosaccharides (HMO) are a subject of particular interest in supplementation and intervention.

A Cochrane review in 2020 (updated in 2023) found low- to moderate-quality evidence that supplementation of probiotics enterally "prevents severe NEC, as well as all-cause mortality in preterm infants" but cautioned that the evidence was not sufficient to inform policy and practice and that further high-quality trials are needed.

Advancing enteral feed volumes at lower rates does not appear to reduce the risk of NEC or death in very preterm infants and seems to increase the risk of invasive infection. Not beginning feeding an infant by mouth for more than 4 days does not appear to have protective benefits.

== Treatment ==
If a baby is diagnosed with NEC, treatment should begin immediately. Treatment consists primarily of supportive care, including providing bowel rest by stopping enteral feeds, gastric decompression with intermittent suction, fluid repletion to correct electrolyte abnormalities and third-space losses, support for blood pressure, parenteral nutrition, and prompt antibiotic therapy.

Monitoring is clinical, although serial supine and left lateral decubitus abdominal X-rays should be performed every six hours.

As an infant recovers from NEC, feeds are gradually introduced. "Trophic feeds" or low-volume feeds (<20 ml/kg/day) are usually initiated first. How and what to feed are determined by the extent of bowel involved, the need for surgical intervention, and the infant's clinical appearance.

Where the disease is not halted through medical treatment alone, or when the bowel perforates, immediate emergency surgery to resect the dead bowel is generally required, although abdominal drains may be placed in very unstable infants as a temporizing measure. Surgery may require a colostomy, which may be able to be reversed at a later time. Some children may develop short bowel syndrome if extensive portions of the bowel must be removed.

In the case of an infant whose bowel is left in discontinuity, the surgical creation of a mucous fistula or connection to the distal bowel may be helpful, as this allows for refeeding of ostomy output to the distal bowel. This refeeding process is believed to improve bowel adaptation and aid in advancement of feeds.

== Prognosis ==
Typical recovery from NEC if medical, nonsurgical treatment succeeds, includes 10–14 days or more without oral intake, and then demonstrated ability to resume feedings and gain weight. Recovery from NEC alone may be compromised by co-morbid conditions that frequently accompany prematurity. Long-term complications of medical NEC include bowel obstruction and anemia.

In the United States, NEC caused 355 deaths per 100,000 live births in 2013, down from 484 per 100,000 live births in 2009. Rates of death were almost three times higher for the black population than for the white population.

When NEC is diagnosed and treated immediately, the prognosis for babies is generally very good. Most babies recover fully without any additional health problems. Overall, about 70-80% of infants who develop NEC survive. Medical management of NEC shows an increased chance of survival compared to surgical management. Despite a significant mortality risk, long-term prognosis for infants undergoing NEC surgery is improving, with survival rates of 70–80%. However, "Surgical NEC" survivors are still at risk for possible long-term complications, such as narrowing of the intestines or Short bowel syndrome and neurodevelopmental disability.

== Society and advocacy ==
The NEC Society is a 501(c)(3), non-profit organization dedicated to building a world without necrotizing enterocolitis (NEC) through research, advocacy, and education. The NEC Society was launched in January 2014 by Jennifer Canvasser after her son, Micah, died from complications of NEC just before his first birthday. The NEC Society is a patient-led organization that collaborates with expert clinicians and researchers to better understand, prevent, and treat this devastating neonatal intestinal disease. Today, patient-families and experts from around the world work together to improve outcomes for the most vulnerable infants at risk of NEC. Their work and numerous initiatives combine the patient-family perspective with solutions based on the best available scientific evidence.

=== NEC Symposium ===
The NEC Society hosts an in-person, biennial Symposium where clinicians, scientists and patient-families come together to listen, learn and collaborate. It is held as an "All-In Meeting", where all stakeholders are fully integrated and empowered. Patient-families are central to the planning, preparation, and execution of the meeting. Each session is dedicated to a baby affected by NEC. Patient-families take part in each session as faculty and also present posters.
