= Symphysis pubis dysfunction =

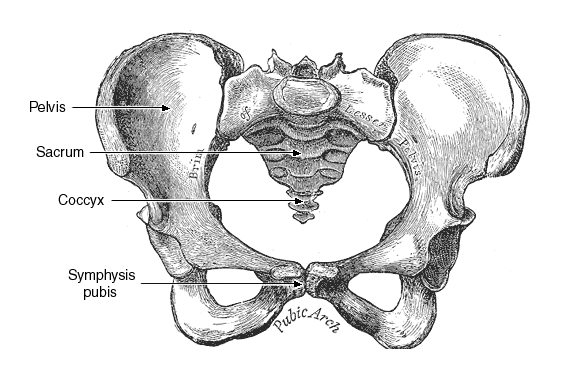
- Location of pubic symphysis
- Specialty: OB/Gyn

Symphysis pubis dysfunction (SPD), commonly known as pubic symphysis dysfunction', is a condition that causes excessive movement of the pubic symphysis, either anterior or lateral, as well as associated pain, possibly because of a misalignment of the pelvis. Most commonly associated with pregnancy and childbirth, it is diagnosed in approximately 25% of pregnancies, although some estimates of incidence are as high as 67%.

SPD is associated with pelvic girdle pain and the names are often used interchangeably.

== Symptoms ==
The main symptom is usually pain or discomfort in the pelvic region, usually centered on the joint at the front of the pelvis (the pubic symphysis). Some sufferers report being able to hear and feel the pubic symphysis and/or sacroiliac, clicking or popping in and out as they walk or change position. Sufferers frequently also experience pain in the lower back, hips, groin, lower abdomen, and legs. The severity of the pain can range from mild discomfort to extreme pain that interferes with routine activities, family, social and professional life, and sleep. There have been links between SPD and depression due to the associated physical discomfort. Sufferers may walk with a characteristic side-to-side gait and have difficulty climbing stairs, problems with leg abduction and adduction, pain when carrying out weight bearing activities, difficulties carrying out everyday activities, and difficulties standing.

== Diagnosis ==
A diagnosis is usually made from the symptoms, history, and physical exam alone. After pregnancy, MRI scans, X-rays and ultrasound scanning are sometimes used. Patients typically initially report symptoms to a midwife, chiropractor, obstetrician, general practitioner, physiotherapist or an osteopath. On seeing a health professional, patients should expect to receive a thorough physical examination to rule out other lumbar spine problems, such as a prolapsed disc or pelvic and or pubis joint misalignment, or other conditions such as iliopsoas muscle spasms, urinary tract infections and Braxton Hicks contractions.

Unnecessary radiation from medical imaging is avoided during pregnancy, so in most cases a physical examination and history are considered sufficient to refer to physical therapy.

== Treatment ==
A promising treatment for chronic or post natal dysfunction is prolotherapy. Other treatments include the use of elbow crutches, pelvic support devices and prescribed pain relief. The majority of problems will resolve spontaneously after delivery. There are two case studies that show reduction of pain and dysfunction with conservative chiropractic care.

Physical therapists—especially those specializing in pelvic floor physical therapy—can assist with pain relief techniques, provide manual therapy to alleviate related muscle spasms, and manage exercise protocols.

While most pregnancy-related cases are reported to resolve postpartum, definitive diagnosis and treatment are still appropriate in order to optimize comfort and function and ensure a good course of recovery.

Long-term complications can develop without proper care. Postpartum follow-up in cases of pregnancy-related SPD may include radiologic imaging, evaluation by a specialist such as an orthopedist or physiatrist, ongoing pelvic floor physical therapy, and assessment for any underlying or related musculoskeletal issues.

In extreme cases that do not resolve with conservative management, surgery is considered after pregnancy to stabilise the pelvis, but success rates are very poor.

=== Everyday living ===
Typical advice usually given to people with SPD includes avoiding strenuous exercise, prolonged standing, repetitive reaching movements, lunges, stretching exercises and squatting. Patients are also frequently advised to:

- Brace the transverse abdominis (lower abdominal muscles) before performing any activity which might cause pain
- Rest the pelvis
- Sit down for tasks where possible (e.g. dressing, workplace discussions, teaching, repetitive manual tasks)
- Avoid lifting and carrying
- Avoid stepping over things
- Avoid straddle movements especially when weight bearing
- Bend the knees and keep the legs 'glued together' when turning in bed and getting in and out of bed, while engaging transverse abdominis
- Place a pillow between the legs when in bed or resting
- Avoid twisting movements of the body

If the pain is very severe, using a walker or crutches will help take the weight off the pelvis and assist with mobility. Alternatively, for more extreme cases a wheelchair may be considered advisable.

=== Pharmacological interventions ===
It is not usually considered advisable to take anti-inflammatory medication in pregnancy, which makes SPD a particularly difficult condition to manage. Acetaminophen may be a safer option. Of note, opiates are considered high risk with a more addictive nature, and carry a risk of depressed respiration in the newborn baby if taken near the time of birth, if taken at all. Therefore, it is considered advisable to discuss any pain relief medications with a physician, and cease taking any opiates 2–4 weeks before the estimated due date, as advised by a medical professional.

== See also ==
- Diastasis symphysis pubis, the separation of normally joined pubic bones
- Osteitis pubis, inflammation of the pubic symphysis
- Pelvic girdle pain, pregnancy related pelvic girdle pain
