= Leonardo Gigli =

Italian surgeon and obstetrician

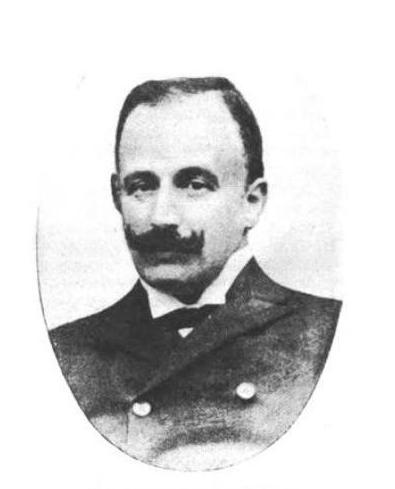
Leonardo Gigli c. 1900

Leonardo Gigli (30 April 1863, Sesto Fiorentino – 4 April 1908, Florence) was an Italian surgeon and obstetrician remembered for describing a medical procedure called Gigli's operation, and for designing the Gigli saw to simplify its performance.

== Biography ==
Leonardo Gigli was born in a villa in the town of Sesto Fiorentino on 30 April 1863. He attended school and university in Florence, graduating in medicine and surgery in 1889. He initially worked as assistant to the professor of clinical paediatric surgery, and became assistant in clinical obstetrics and gynaecology in Florence under Professor Domenico Chiara in November 1889.

When Chiara died in 1891 Gigli left Italy, travelling to Paris to work under Tarnier, then to London and Wrocław (then Breslau) where he worked under Professor Heinrich Fritsch from November 1892 to June 1893. During his time in Wrocław, he was also able to attend surgery with Mikulicz; here he first designed the wire saw which was manufactured by the Haertel company. He wrote about the use of this saw, which became known as the Gigli saw, to perform lateral pubiotomy (Gigli's operation) to assist in obstructed labour in July 1893 and again in October 1894 in the Annals of Obstetrics and Gynaecology of Milan.

He returned to Florence in March 1894 to work at the Hospital of Santa Maria Nuova, and continued as a proponent of the lateral pubiotomy using the wire saw despite the lack of support from colleagues in Italy. He also described the use of his saw for cutting other bones, excepting the skull, in 1897; Professor Alfred Obalinski of Kraków then described its use for craniotomy in the same year.

In 1899, he became director of the Santa Maria Nuova Hospital. He resigned from this post in 1901 to work in private practice and to concentrate on scientific work, having never received a university appointment. He died at home in Florence on 4 April 1908 of pneumonia at the age of 44.

== Legacy ==
Although Gigli's operation, the lateral pubiotomy, is rarely performed today, the Gigli saw is still used to perform amputations and cranial flaps, and to section the sternum when performing an emergency clamshell thoracotomy. The Gigli saw also is used in orthopaedic surgery. The saw is passed subperiosteally through the greater sciatic notch, from where it is drawn lateralward to perform Salter's single iliac osteotomy in the treatment of hip dysplasia. Gigli's saw also may be passed subperiosteally around the superior ramus for pubiotomy as part of Bernese periacetabular osteotomy for hip dysplasia. In both cases, the saw allows an osteotomy to be performed by cutting away from critical neurovascular structures: in Salter, away from sciatic nerve and superior gluteal artery, in Bernese, away from the corona mortis.

== The Gigli Archive and Library ==
The Library of the Museo Galileo hosts an archival fond and a librarian fond named after Leonardo Gigli.

The first gathers the personal correspondence (approximately 320 letters and postcards) and the scientific correspondence (approximately 300 letters), as well as documents attesting Gigli's professional training and many scientific writings and notes. Those allow the reader to reconstruct the author's progression, particularly for what concerns the development of the surgical practice adopted by Gigli in the obstetrical and gynaecological field, with the use of the wire saw.

The second fond is made of approximately 200 works dealing with medicine, and more precisely with obstetrics and gynaecology, mostly in Italian and German language.

Both fonds were donated to the Institute and Museum of History of Science, now Museo Galileo, by Leonardo Gigli's brother Ottavio in 1954 and grandson Fulvio in 2003, together with some of Gigli's surgical instruments.
