= Gigli saw =

Flexible wire saw for bone cutting

Gigli wire saw

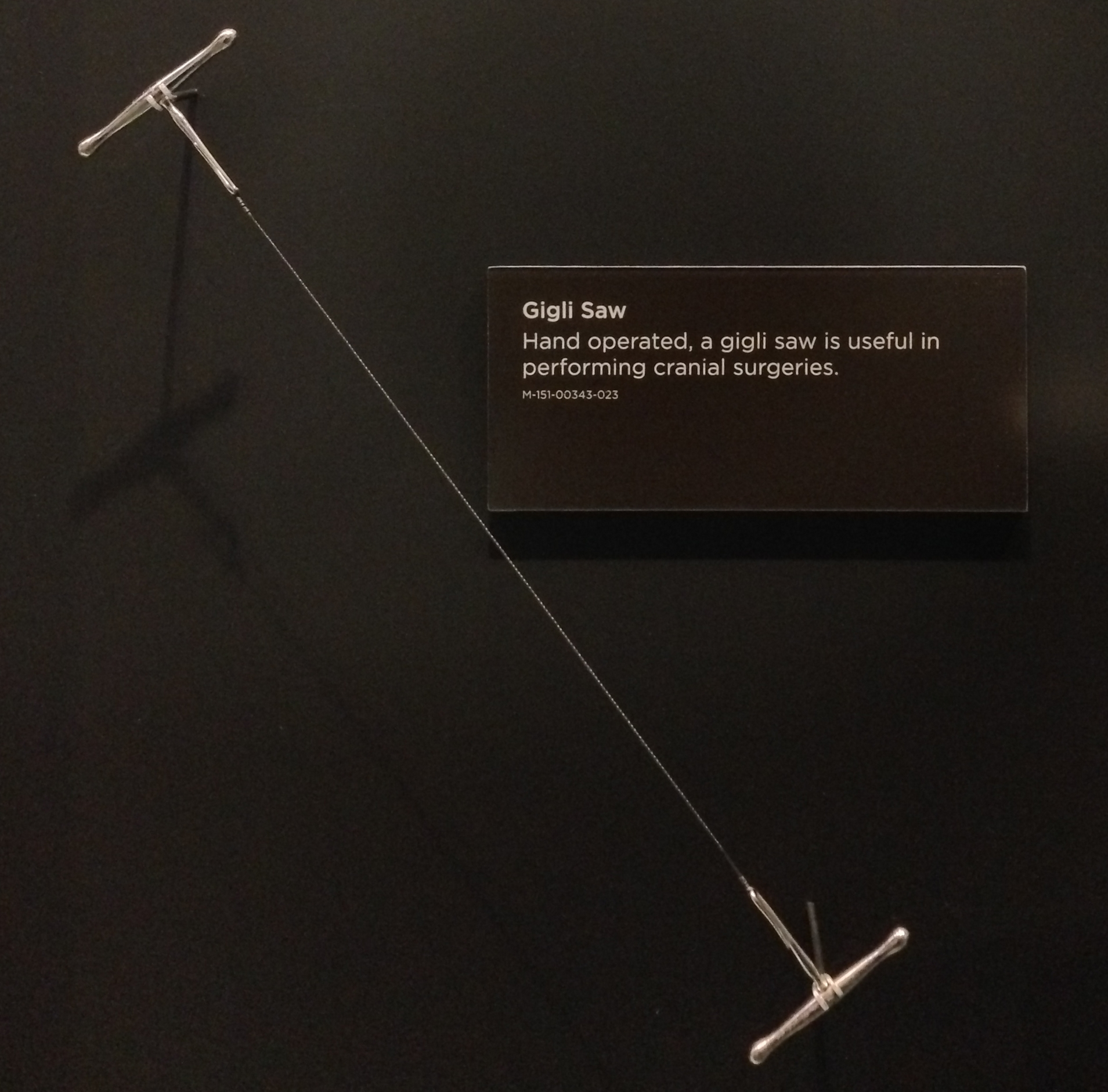
Hand operated, a gigli saw is useful in performing cranial surgeries.

A Gigli saw is a flexible wire saw used by surgeons for bone cutting. A Gigli saw is used mainly for amputation, where the bones have to be smoothly cut at the level of amputation. In addition, it was once commonly used to perform craniotomies for brain surgery, before the invention of powered skull saws. It is also used in veterinary medicine for cutting antler, horn, and tusks, as well as bone.

The saw was invented by Leonardo Gigli, an Italian obstetrician, to simplify the performance of a lateral pubiotomy in obstructed labour.

It is featured in the 2023 American horror film Saw X and in Dexter: Resurrection by Ronald Schmidt, the Dark Passenger killer.

== See also ==
- Instruments used in general surgery
