= Symphysiotomy controversy in Ireland =

Controversy regarding birthing procedure

From approximately 2000, there was a controversy over the use of symphysiotomies during childbirth in the Republic of Ireland between 1944 and 1987. In 2002 an advocacy group called Survivors of Symphysiotomy (SoS) was set up in Ireland alleging religiously motivated symphysiotomies were performed without consent and against best medical practice in Republic of Ireland between 1944 and 1987. In 2014 Ireland agreed to pay women who received the procedure compensation without admitting liability. Some media reported that pubiotomy was also practised, but only one payout was given in 2014 for an "accidental" pubiotomy that occurred in the 1950s.

== History ==
It is estimated that 1,500 women unknowingly and without consent underwent symphysiotomies during childbirth in the Republic of Ireland between 1944 and 1987. However, an accurate total number is not available because the Irish state has never required hospitals to produce their records.

Most of these operations took place during labour, where cephalopelvic disproportion was suspected.

A 2012 report found that many of the victims say the Catholic Church "encouraged, if not insisted upon, symphysiotomies." It has been suggested that during that period, non-Catholic doctors recommended sterilisation of women after three caesarean section operations, while Catholic doctors usually recommended "compassionate hysterectomies" as a solution to the prohibition on sterilisations. Despite legal restrictions being placed on the use of artificial contraceptives, the average size of families in Ireland declined from the 1930s.

Dr. Alex Spain was master of the National Maternity Hospital during the mid-20th century, and performed 43 symphysiotomies during his tenure. Spain's successor, Arthur Barry, was also a strong supporter of Catholicism and the practice of symphysiotomy. Dr Barry is reported to have assured his colleagues ‘[i]t is easy to know when to do the operation [of symphysiotomy]: do it when [Caesarean] section would otherwise have been employed, but be even more generous in your application. Interfere early’.

Dr Barry considered consent unnecessary for symhysiotomy and is reported to have said: 'Surely it will be a sad day for obstetrics when we allow the patient to direct us as to the line of treatment which is best for the case.'

In 2002, survivor Matilda Behan and her daughter, Bernadette, set up an advocacy group for the victims called Survivors of Symphysiotomy (SoS). Matilda was operated upon at NMH 17 days before her baby was born. She thought she was being brought to theatre for a caesarean section. No one told her the plan was to do the 'new procedure,' a pubiotomy. In 2008, the Irish Human Rights Commission recommended that the Government should reconsider its decision not to set up an independent inquiry into symphysiotomy. The Minister for Health refused.

On 18 February 2010, an RTÉ Prime Time documentary revealed that hospital clinical reports, such as those of the International Missionary Training Hospital (now Our Lady of Lourdes Hospital, Drogheda), show that over half a century, some 1,500 women had symphysiotomies performed on them during childbirth by doctors as hospital policy, in order to train medical personnel and perfect the surgery for use in Africa. Following the programme, victims of the procedure called on the Minister for Health, Mary Harney, to initiate an independent inquiry. Instead, she commissioned the IOG, a training body, to inquire into itself by reviewing operations carried out by some of its own members for teaching purposes.

A Dáil debate on the issue was heard on 15 March 2012, which was organised by Deputy Caoimhghín Ó Caoláin. Leading the debate in the Dáil, Ó Caoláin compared symphysiotomy to clerical abuse: "The infliction of symphysiotomy on women in Ireland is one of the greatest medical scandals not only here but on an international scale. Symphysiotomy is a clinical scandal on a par with the clerical scandals we have seen exposed in the past two decades." Gerry Adams described the procedure as "institutional abuse involving acts of butchery against women." While Clare Daly declared that "it is an important acknowledgment by the State of the crimes committed against many of the women present today, crimes which led to the suffering endured by them and their families for decades".

Eight days later, on 23 March 2012, a County Louth woman, Olivia Kearney, who was subjected to a post caesarean-section symphysiotomy, which was performed by Dr. Gerard Connolly, was awarded €450,000 by the High Court. The Kearney case was appealed to the Irish Supreme Court, which found in favour of Ms. Kearney and declared that symphysiotomy was not a generally approved obstetric practice in 1969. While the Supreme Court reduced the award of damages from €450,000 to €325,000, the decision represented the first court condemnation of the practice of symphysiotomy by an institution of the Irish state.

In June 2012 details of Professor Oonagh Walsh's draft report on the use of this procedure in Ireland were released. The report by Prof. Walsh (UCC) found that although symphysiotomies were phased out in most medical institutions across the country, Our Lady of Lourdes Hospital was practising the procedure until the 1980s, a fact linked to the "unswervingly Catholic ethos" of the hospital. The draft Walsh report nevertheless found that symphysiotomy was justifiable and sought to consult with survivors on its findings.

The draft Walsh report was criticised by victims' advocate group Survivors of Symphysiotomy, as well as by a number of opposition TDs and journalists, for failing to adequately address issues such as patient consent and for perceivably justifying the performance of the operation. Survivors of Symphysiotomy members subsequently decided to boycott the second stage of the Walsh report.

Also in June 2012, Survivors of Symphysiotomy testified publicly before the Joint Oireachtas (Select) Committee on Justice. Catherine McKeever, a private patient at the Lourdes Hospital, Drogheda in 1969, told the Committee that she did not realise what had happened: 'I saw him [the doctor] with an instrument which I thought was a bit brace because my father was a wood turner. I felt a crack ... Nobody answered me or said anything'. Margaret Conlan, who was operated upon in 1962 in St Finbarr's Hospital, Cork, testified that she had never been told anything about it: 'My baby's head was perforated and the baby died... I did not find out [about the symphysiotomy] until I read it in the newspaper'.

Ó Caoláin introduced the Statute of Limitations (Amendment) Bill, which was unanimously supported by Dáil on 17 April 2013. The proposed legislation sought to lift the statute of limitations for a period of one year, to enable all survivors of symphysiotomy to bring their cases through the Irish courts. By July 2013, the Bill had stalled before the Joint Oireachtas (Select) Committee on Justice, leading SoS to protest outside the Parliament on 26 June.

In November 2013, Minister for Health James Reilly announced that Judge Yvonne Murphy had been appointed to review the findings of the Walsh report, to meet with survivors of symphysiotomy, hospital authorities, and insurers with a view to deciding on whether an ex gratia redress scheme would be preferred to allowing legal actions to proceed. The terms of reference for the Murphy inquiry were criticised by Caoimhghín Ó Caoláin, who stated that the "type of scheme outlined in the terms of reference offers the women no prospect of adequate compensation for what was so barbarically done to them nor the choice to pursue their rights in the courts". It also emerged that the Government would no longer support the statute of limitations bill, which had been unanimously adopted by the Dáil in April 2013. SoS rejected the Government's statement and described their plans as 'paternalistic'.

In March 2014, Survivors of Symphysiotomy made a complaint to the United Nations Committee Against Torture about the Irish State's failure to properly, thoroughly or impartially investigate the practice of symphysiotomy in Ireland. In July, the United Nations Human Rights Committee called on the Irish government to hold an investigation into the issue, including prosecuting those who carried out symphysiotomy without consent. However, the Irish State has refused to accept that the doctors who carried out these operations should be prosecuted. This is despite the fact that consent was required for non-emergency surgery in Ireland at the time.

In 2014 an investigation was established under Judge Harding Clark to allow the Ex-gratia Payment. In October 2016, this body published their report establishing that this procedure was used only rarely, and in very difficult labours. She found no evidence to support the claim that a symphysiotomy caused lifelong disability or suffering. Nevertheless, women who had the procedure were awarded compensation. The report found that at least one third of women claiming to have suffered from having the procedure never had symphysiotomies. Although these claimants were denied compensation, others with weak evidence received pay-outs. Judge Harding Clark stated 'I believe that early uncritical reliance on medical reports led me to make awards where it is highly probable that no symphysiotomy was performed.' Commenting on the Harding Clark report, Nil Muižnieks on behalf of the Council for Europe stated that he was ‘particularly struck by the patronising tone’ of the report and that it did not ‘give acknowledgement to women’s suffering and seems to perpetuate some gender stereotypes against (elderly) women.’
