= Pelvic girdle pain =

Medical condition

Pelvic girdle pain (PGP) is a musculoskeletal condition characterized by pain arising from one or more joints of the pelvic girdle, most commonly the pubic symphysis and sacroiliac joints. It is frequently associated with pregnancy and the postpartum period, and may range from mild discomfort to severe functional limitation. PGP can cause pain, instability, and reduced mobility, particularly during weight-bearing activities. The condition has been recognized in medical literature since antiquity, having been mentioned by Hippocrates and later described in detail by Snelling in the nineteenth century.

The affection appears to consist of relaxation of the pelvic articulations, becoming apparent suddenly after parturition or gradually during pregnancy and permitting a degree of mobility of the pelvic bones which effectively hinders locomotion and gives rise to the most peculiar and alarming sensations.

— Snelling (1870)

== Definition and terminology ==
PGP refers to pain arising from one or more of the joints that make up the pelvic girdle, including the pubic symphysis and the sacroiliac joints. It is most commonly associated with pregnancy and the postpartum period, but may also occur outside of pregnancy. It is considered distinct from lumbar spine, and related low back pain, although the two conditions may coexist. The pain is typically localized to the anterior or posterior pelvis and is often aggravated by weight bearing activities or movements involving transfer of load through the pelvis. In contemporary medical literature, the term pregnancy-related pelvic girdle pain (PRPGP) is commonly used to describe symptoms occurring during pregnancy, while similar symptoms persisting after delivery are referred to as postpartum pelvic girdle pain.

== Differentiation from low back pain ==
Pelvic girdle pain is considered a distinct clinical entity from pregnancy related low back pain, although the two conditions may coexist. While low back pain typically originates from the lumbar spine and surrounding musculature, pelvic girdle pain arises from the joints of the pelvic ring, most commonly the sacroiliac joints and the pubic symphysis. The location and nature of pain may assist in differentiation. Pelvic girdle pain is usually felt between the posterior iliac crest and the gluteal fold, or at the anterior pelvis near the symphysis pubis, and is frequently aggravated by weight bearing or asymmetrical movements such as walking, stair climbing, turning in bed, or standing on one leg. In contrast, lumbar pain is more often associated with spinal movements and prolonged static postures. Clinical assessment is primarily based on patient history and physical examination, and specific pain provocation tests are commonly used to distinguish pelvic girdle pain from lumbar spine disorders.

== Diagnosis ==
The diagnosis of pelvic girdle pain is primarily clinical and is based on the patient’s history and physical examination. Assessment focuses on the location of pain, its relationship to weight bearing activities, and the presence of functional limitations involving movements such as walking, stair climbing, turning in bed, or standing on one leg. Clinical examination may include pain provocation tests designed to assess the pubic symphysis and sacroiliac joints, which can help distinguish pelvic girdle pain from lumbar spine related disorders. Imaging studies are not routinely required and are generally avoided during pregnancy unless serious pathology is suspected. When performed, imaging is mainly reserved for atypical presentations, severe trauma, or persistent postpartum symptoms.

== Classification ==
Prior to the 20th century, specialists of pregnancy-related PGP used varying terminologies. It is now referred to as Pregnancy Related Pelvic Girdle Pain that may incorporate the following conditions:

- Diastasis of the symphysis pubis (DSP)
- Symphysis pubis dysfunction (SPD)
- Pelvic Joint Syndrome
- Physiological Pelvic Girdle Relaxation
- Symptom Giving Pelvic Girdle Relaxation
- Posterior Pelvic Pain
- Pelvic Arthropathy
- Inferior Pubic Shear/ Superior Pubic Shear /Symphyseal Shear
- Symphysiolysis
- Osteitis pubis (usually postpartum)
- Sacroiliitis
- One-sided Sacroiliac Syndrome /Double Sided Sacroiliac Syndrome
- Hypermobility

"The classification between hormonal and mechanical pelvic girdle instability is no longer used. For treatment and/or prognosis it makes no difference whether the complaints started during pregnancy or after childbirth." Mens (2005)

== Signs and symptoms ==
A combination of postural changes, the position and weight of the baby, unstable pelvic joints under the influence of pregnancy hormones, and changes in the centre of gravity can all add to the varying degrees of pain or discomfort. In some cases it can come on suddenly or following a fall, sudden abduction of the thighs (opening too wide too quickly) or an action that has strained the joint.

PGP can begin as early as the first trimester of pregnancy. Pain is usually felt low down over the symphyseal joint, and this area may be extremely tender to the touch. Pain may also be felt in the hips, groin and lower abdomen and can radiate down the inner thighs. Women with PGP may begin to waddle or shuffle, and may be aware of an audible clicking sound coming from the pelvis. PGP can develop slowly during pregnancy, gradually gaining in severity as the pregnancy progresses.

During pregnancy and postpartum, the symphyseal gap can be felt moving or straining when walking, climbing stairs or turning over in bed; these activities can be difficult or even impossible. The pain may remain static, e.g., in one place such as the front of the pelvis, producing the feeling of having been kicked; in other cases it may start in one area and move to other areas. It is also possible that a woman may experience a combination of symptoms.

Any weight bearing activity has the potential of aggravating an already unstable pelvis, producing symptoms that may limit the ability of the woman to carry out many daily activities. She may experience pain involving movements such as dressing, getting in and out of the bath, rolling in bed, climbing the stairs or sexual activity. Pain may also be present when lifting, carrying, pushing or pulling.

The symptoms (and their severity) experienced by women with PGP vary, but include:

- Present swelling and/or inflammation over joint.
- Difficulty lifting leg.
- Pain pulling legs apart.
- Inability to stand on one leg.
- Inability to transfer weight through pelvis and legs.
- Pain in hips and/or restriction of hip movement.
- Transferred nerve pain down leg.
- Can be associated with bladder and/or bowel dysfunction.
- A feeling of the symphysis pubis giving way.
- Stooped back when standing.
- Malalignment of pelvic and/or back joints.
- Struggle to sit or stand.
- Pain may also radiate down the inner thighs.
- Waddling or shuffling gait.
- Audible 'clicking' sound coming from the pelvis.

=== Severity ===
The severity and instability of the pelvis can be measured on a three level scale.

Pelvic type 1:The pelvic ligaments support the pelvis sufficiently. Even when the muscles are used incorrectly, no complaints will occur when performing everyday activities. This is the most common situation in persons who have never been pregnant, who have never been in an accident, and who are not hypermobile.

Pelvic type 2:The ligaments alone do not support the joint sufficiently. A coordinated use of muscles around the joint will compensate for ligament weakness. In case the muscles around the joint do not function, the patient will experience pain and weakness when performing everyday activities. This type often occurs after giving birth to a child weighing 3000 grams or more, in cases of hypermobility, and sometimes after an accident involving the pelvis. Type 2 is the most common form of pelvic instability. Treatment is based on learning how to use the muscles around the pelvis more efficiently.

Pelvic type 3:The ligaments do not support the joint sufficiently. This is a serious situation whereby the muscles around the joint are unable to compensate for ligament weakness. This type of pelvic instability usually only occurs after an accident, or occasionally after a (small) accident in combination with giving birth. Sometimes a small accident occurring long before giving birth is forgotten so that the pelvic instability is attributed only to the childbirth. Although the difference between Type 2 and 3 is often difficult to establish, in case of doubt an exercise program may help the patient. However, if Pelvic Type 3 has been diagnosed then invasive treatment is the only option: in this case parts of the pelvis are screwed together. (Mens 2005)

=== Psychosocial impact ===
PGP in pregnancy seriously interferes with participation in society and activities of daily life; the average sick leave due to posterior pelvic pain during pregnancy is 7 to 12 weeks.

In some cases women with PGP may also experience emotional problems such as anxiety over the cause of pain, resentment, anger, lack of self-esteem, frustration and depression; she is three times more likely to develop postpartum depressive symptoms. Other psychosocial risk factors associated with woman experiencing PGP include higher level of stress, low job satisfaction and poorer relationship with spouse.

== Causes ==
Sometimes there is no obvious explanation for the cause of PGP but usually there is a combination of factors such as:

1. The pelvic joints moving unevenly.
2. A change in the activity of the muscles in the pelvis, hip, abdomen, back and pelvic floor.
3. A history of pelvic trauma.
4. The position of the baby altering the loading stresses on the pelvic ligaments and joints.
5. Strenuous work.
6. Previous lower back pain.
7. Previous pelvic girdle pain during pregnancy.
8. Hypermobility, genetical ability to stretch joints beyond normal range.
9. An event during the pregnancy or birth that caused injury or strain to the pelvic joints or rupture of the fibrocartilage.
10. The occurrence of PGP is associated with twin pregnancy, first pregnancy and a higher age at first pregnancy.

=== Risk factors ===
Several factors have been associated with an increased likelihood of developing pelvic girdle pain during pregnancy. These include a history of pelvic girdle pain in a previous pregnancy, prior low back pain, and hypermobility or connective tissue laxity. Obstetric factors such as twin pregnancy, first pregnancy, and higher maternal age at first pregnancy have also been reported to increase risk. In addition, physically demanding work, previous pelvic trauma, and activities involving repetitive or asymmetrical loading of the pelvis may contribute to symptom development. Although multiple risk factors have been identified, the presence or absence of individual factors does not reliably predict the severity or duration of symptoms. No single risk factor has been shown to be sufficient to explain the development of pelvic girdle pain, and the condition is considered multifactorial.

== Mechanism ==
Pregnancy related Pelvic Girdle Pain (PGP) can be either specific (trauma or injury to pelvic joints or genetical i.e. connective tissue disease) and non-specific. PGP disorder is complex and multi-factorial and likely to be also represented by a series of sub-groups driven by pain varying from peripheral or central nervous system, altered laxity/stiffness of muscles, laxity to injury of tendinous/ligamentous structures to 'mal-adaptive' body mechanics.

Pregnancy begins the physiological changes through a pattern of hormonal secretion and signal transduction thus initiating the remodelling of soft tissues, cartilage and ligaments. Over time, the ligaments could be stretched either by injury or excess strain and in turn may cause PGP.

=== Anatomy ===
The pelvis is the largest bony part of the skeleton and contains three joints: the pubic symphysis, and two sacroiliac joints. A highly durable network of ligaments surrounds these joints giving them tremendous strength.

The pubic symphysis has a fibrocartilage joint which may contain a fluid filled cavity and is avascular; it is supported by the superior and arcuate ligaments. The sacroiliac joints are synovial, but their movement is restricted throughout life and they are progressively obliterated by adhesions. The nature of the bony pelvic ring with its three joints determines that no one joint can move independently of the other two.

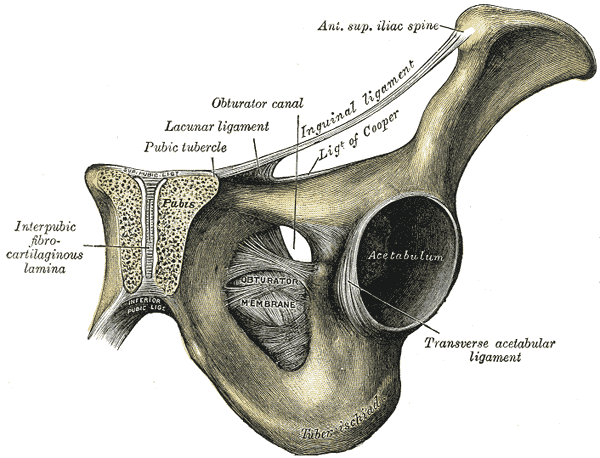
Pubic symphysis

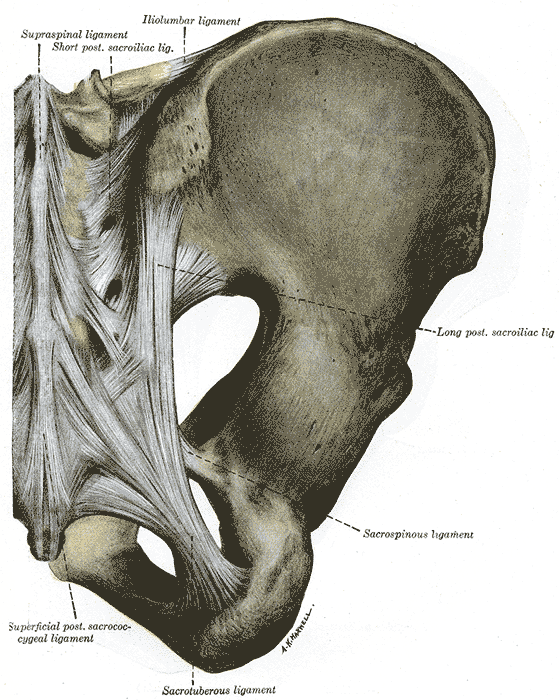
Posterior Sacroiliac joint

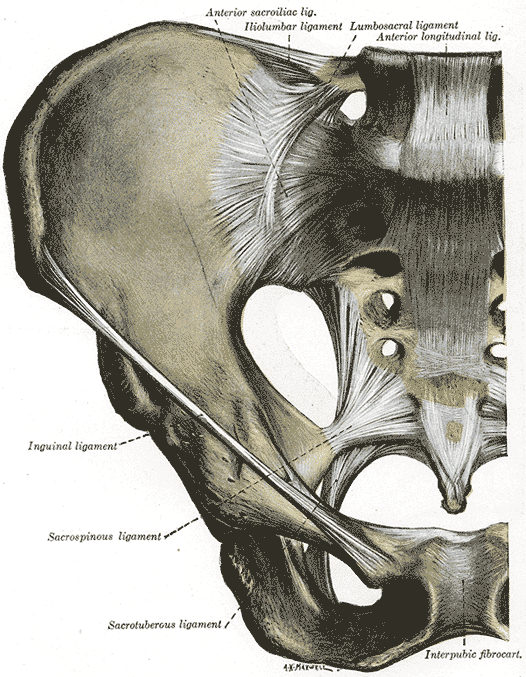
Anterior Sacroiliac joint

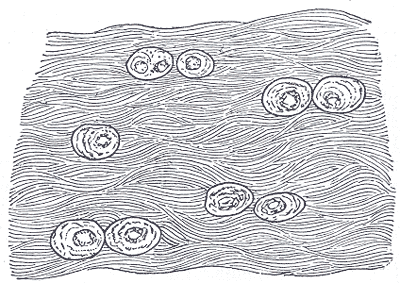
White fibrocartilage from an intervertebral fibrocartilage.

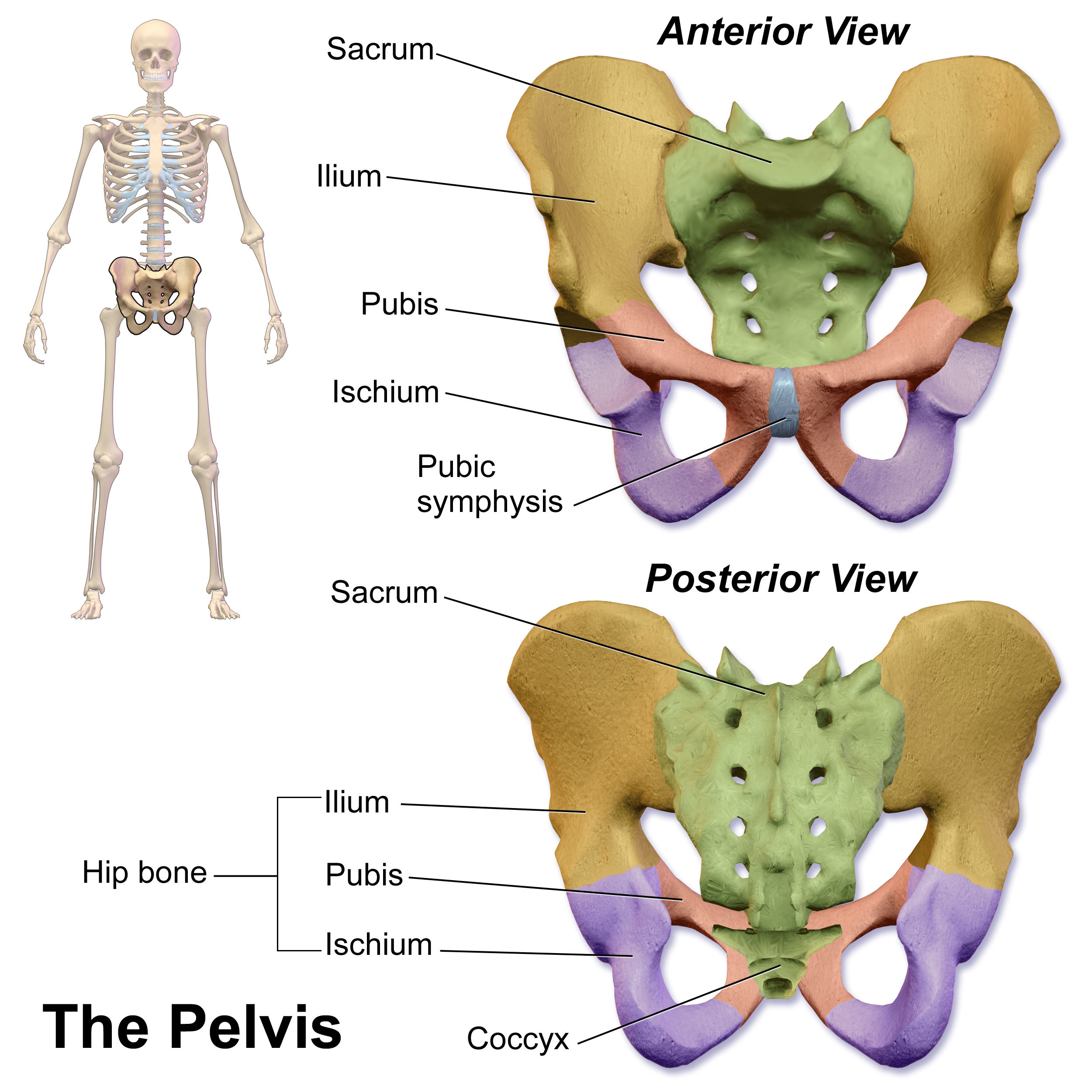
Human pelvis: front and back

=== Relaxin hormone ===
Relaxin is a hormone produced mainly by the corpus luteum of the ovary and breast, in both pregnant and non-pregnant females. During pregnancy it is also produced by the placenta, chorion, and decidua. The body produces relaxin during menstruation that rises to a peak within approximately 14 days of ovulation and then declines. In pregnant cycles, rather than subsiding, relaxin secretion continues to rise during the first trimester and then again in the final weeks. During pregnancy relaxin has a diverse range of effects, including the production and remodelling of collagen thus increasing the elasticity of muscles, tendons, ligaments and tissues of the birth canal in view of delivery.

Although relaxin's main cellular action in pregnancy is to remodel collagen by biosynthesis (thus facilitating the changes of connective tissue) it does not seem to generate musculoskeletal problems. European Research has determined that relaxin levels are not a predictor of PGP during pregnancy.

=== Gait changes ===
The pregnant woman has a different pattern of "gait". The step lengthens as the pregnancy progresses due to weight gain and changes in posture. Both the length and height of the footstep shortens with PGP. Sometimes the foot can turn inwards due to the rotation of the hips when the pelvic joints are unstable. On average, a woman's foot can grow by a half size or more during pregnancy. Pregnancy hormones that are released to adapt the bodily changes also remodel the ligaments in the foot. In addition, the increased body weight of pregnancy, fluid retention and weight gain lowers the arches, further adding to the foot's length and width. There is an increase of load on the lateral side of the foot and the hind foot. These changes may also be responsible for the musculoskeletal complaints of lower limb pain in pregnant women.

During the motion of walking, an upward movement of the pelvis, one side then the other, is required to let the leg follow through. The faster or longer each step the pelvis adjusts accordingly. The flexibility within the knees, ankles and hips are stabilized by the pelvis. Normal gait tends to minimize displacement of centre of gravity whereas abnormal gait through pelvic instability tends to amplify displacement. During pregnancy there may be an increased demand placed on hip abductor, hip extensor, and ankle plantar flexor muscles during walking. To avoid pain on weight bearing structures a very short stance phase and limp occurs on the injured side(s), this is called Antalgic Gait.

== Treatment ==
A number of treatments have some evidence for benefits include an exercise program. Paracetamol (acetaminophen) has not been found effective but is safe. NSAIDs are sometimes effective but should not be used after 30 weeks of pregnancy. There is tentative evidence for acupuncture.

Some pelvic joint trauma will not respond to conservative type treatments and orthopedic surgery might become the only option to stabilize the joints.

== Prognosis and epidemiology ==
For most women, PGP resolves in weeks after delivery but for some it can last for years resulting in a reduced tolerance for weight bearing activities. PGP can take from 11 weeks, 6 months or even up to 2 years postpartum to subside. However, some research supports that the average time to complete recovery is 6.25 years, and the more severe the case is, the longer recovery period.

Overall, about 45% of all pregnant women and 25% of all women postpartum have PGP. During pregnancy, serious pain occurs in about 25%, and severe disability in about 8% of patients. After pregnancy, problems are serious in about 7%. There is no correlation between age, culture, nationality and numbers of pregnancies that determine a higher incidence of PGP.

If a woman experiences PGP during one pregnancy, she is more likely to experience it in subsequent pregnancies; but the severity cannot be determined.
