= Pubiotomy =

Outdated medical procedure

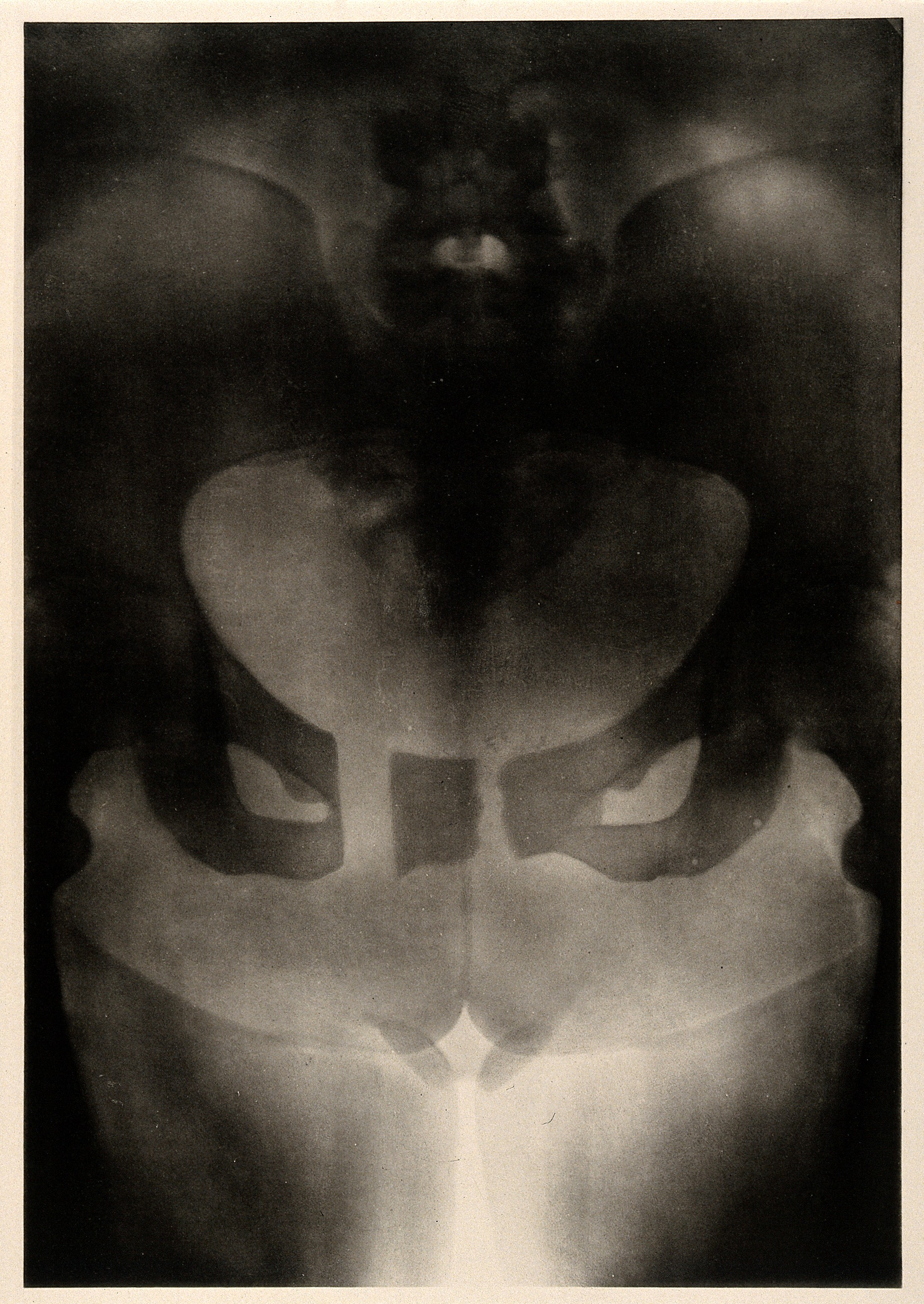
X-ray of a woman's pelvis after a pubiotomy, circa 1908. Two gaps where the pelvic bone was cut are visible.

Pubiotomy was a medical procedure where the pelvic bone was cut in two places, on either side of the pubic symphysis joint, in order to widen the pelvis during obstructed labour. By 1922, it was considered outdated and C-section preferable.

The Gigli saw was invented to perform this procedure.

== See also ==
- Symphysiotomy
