= Fibrocartilage =

Type of tissue

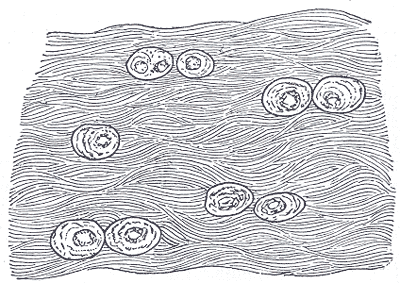
- White fibrocartilage from an intervertebral fibrocartilage.

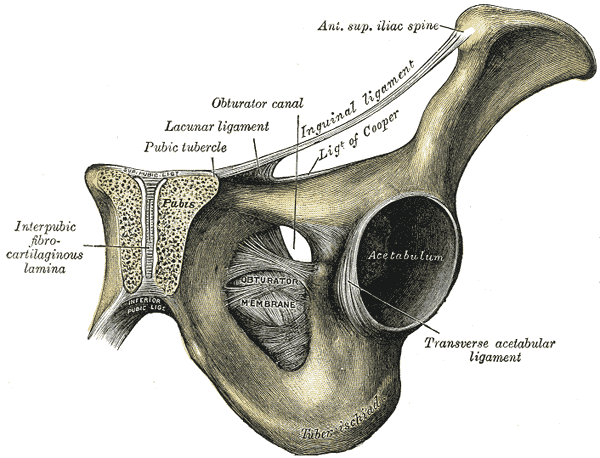
- Symphysis pubis exposed by a coronal section. (Pubic symphysis visible at center left.)

Identifiers
- MeSH: D051445
- TA2: 1541
- TH: H2.00.03.5.00017
- FMA: 64784

Fibrocartilage consists of a mixture of white fibrous tissue and cartilaginous tissue in various proportions. It owes its inflexibility and toughness to the former of these constituents, and its elasticity to the latter. It is the only type of cartilage that contains type I collagen in addition to the normal type II.

== Structure ==
The extracellular matrix of fibrocartilage is mainly made from type I collagen secreted by chondroblasts.

== Locations of fibrocartilage in the human body ==
- secondary cartilaginous joints:
  - pubic symphysis
  - annulus fibrosis of intervertebral discs
  - manubriosternal joint
- glenoid labrum of shoulder joint
- acetabular labrum of hip joint
- medial and lateral menisci of the knee joint
- location where tendons and ligaments attach to bone
- triangular fibrocartilage complex (UTFCC)

== Function ==
=== Repair ===
If hyaline cartilage is torn all the way down to the bone, the blood supply from inside the bone is sometimes enough to start some healing inside the lesion. In cases like this, the body will form a scar in the area using a special type of cartilage called fibrocartilage. Fibrocartilage is a tough, dense, and fibrous material that helps fill in the torn part of the cartilage; however, it is not an ideal replacement for the smooth, glassy articular cartilage that normally covers the surface of joints.

== Clinical significance ==
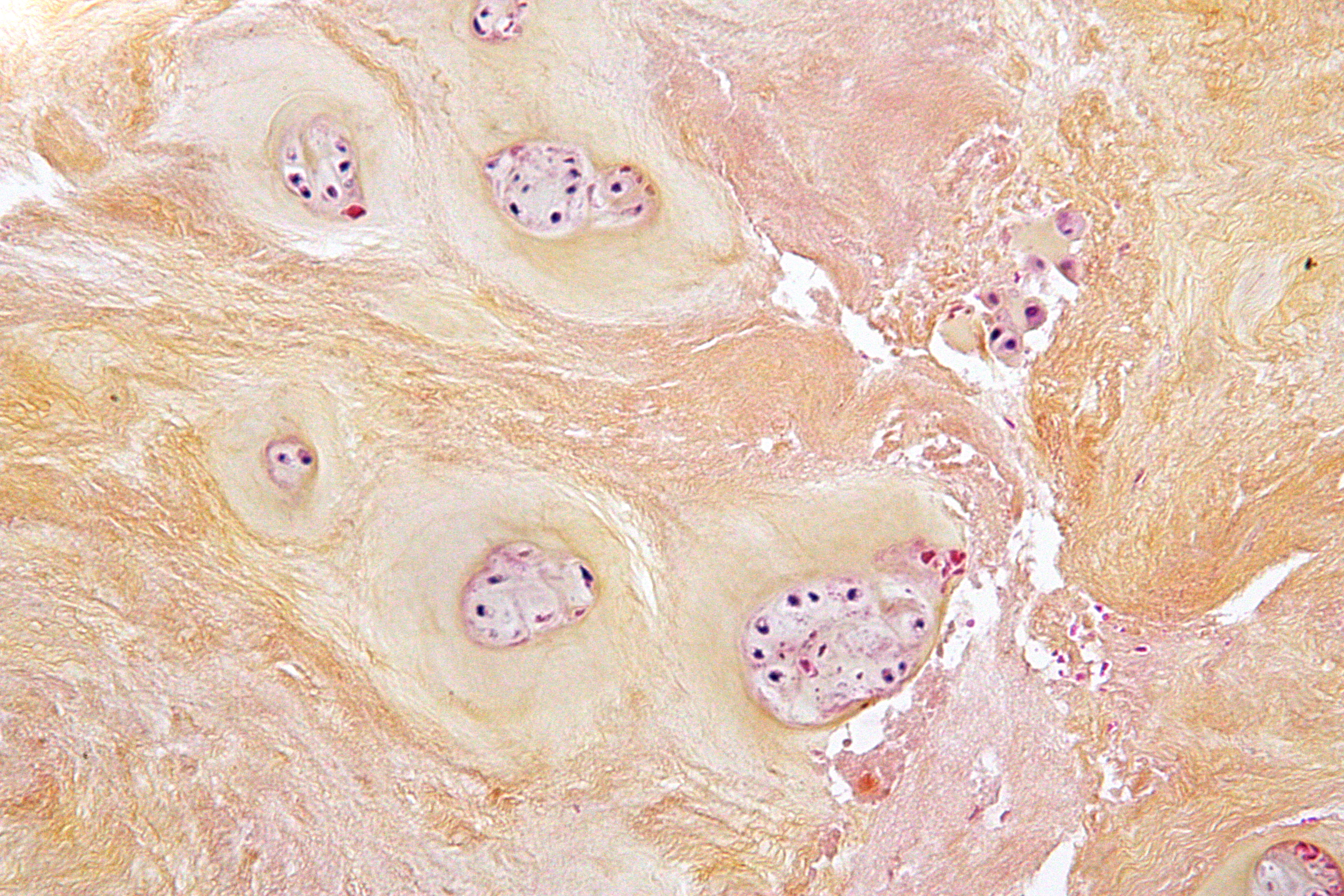
Micrograph showing a fragment of an intervertebral disc demonstrating degenerative fibrocartilage with loss of nuclei and nests of chondrocytes, as seen in degenerative disc disease. HPS stain.

Degeneration of fibrocartilage is seen in degenerative disc disease.

== See also ==
- List of distinct cell types in the adult human body
