= Symphysiotomy =

Surgical procedure to widen the pelvis

- The black area marked by a "5" is the pubic symphysis, which is divided during the procedure
- ICD-9-CM: 73.94

Symphysiotomy is a surgical procedure in which the cartilage of the pubic symphysis is divided to widen the pelvis allowing childbirth when the baby has difficulty fitting through the pelvis (obstructed labour). It is also known as pelviotomy and synchondrotomy. It has largely been supplanted by C-sections, with the exception of certain rare obstetric emergencies or in resource poor settings. It is different from pubiotomy, where the pelvic bone itself is cut in two places, rather than cutting through the symphysis pubis joint.

== Introduction ==
Symphysiotomy was advocated in 1597 by Severin Pineau after his description of a diastasis of the pubis on a hanged pregnant woman. Thus symphysiotomies became a routine surgical procedure for women experiencing an obstructed labour. They became less frequent in the late 20th century after the risk of maternal death from caesarean section decreased (due to improvement in techniques, hygiene, and clinical practice).

== Indications ==
The most common indications are a trapped head of a breech baby, shoulder dystocia which does not resolve with routine manoeuvres, and obstructed labor at full cervical dilation, especially with failed vacuum extraction. Use for shoulder dystocia is controversial.

Currently the procedure is rarely performed in developed countries, but is still performed in "rural areas and resource-poor settings of developing countries" where caesarean sections are not available, or where obstetricians may not be available to deliver subsequent pregnancies. Current practice guidelines in Canada recommend symphysiotomy for trapped head during vaginal delivery of a breech birth.

A 2016 meta-analysis found that in low and middle income countries, there was no difference between maternal and perinatal mortality following either symphysiotomy or C-section. There was a lower risk of infection following symphysiotomy, but a higher risk of fistula, compared to C-section.

== Procedure ==
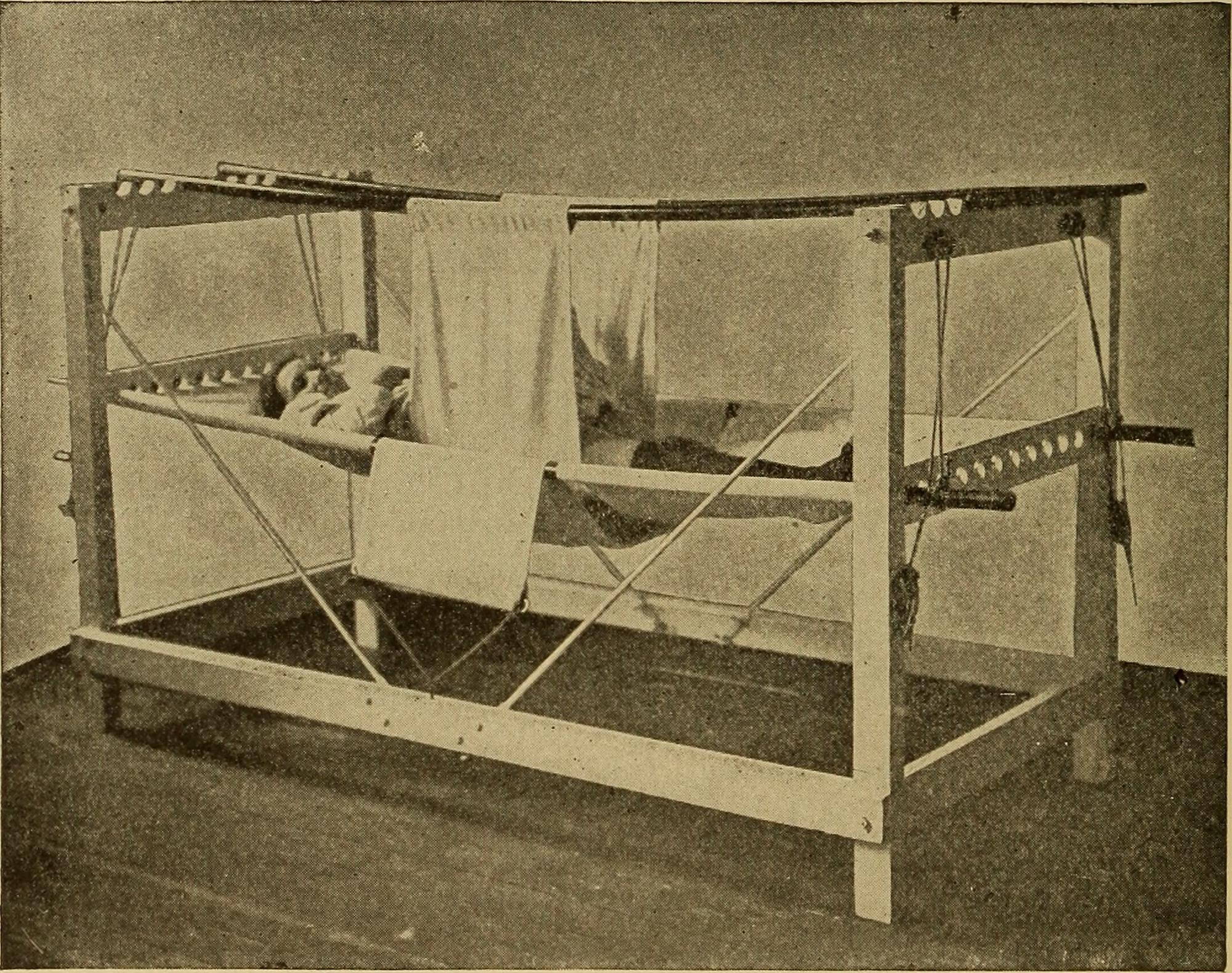
Patient in a symphysiotomy hammock after surgery, 1907

Symphysiotomy results in a temporary increase in pelvic diameter (up to 2 centimetres (0.79 in)) by surgically dividing the ligaments of the symphysis under local anaesthesia. This procedure should be carried out only in combination with vacuum extraction. Symphysiotomy can be a life-saving procedure in areas of the world where caesarean section is not feasible or immediately available as it does not require an operating theatre or "advanced" surgical skills. Since this procedure does not scar the uterus, the concern of future uterine rupture that exists with cesarean section is not a factor.

The procedure carries the risks of urethral and bladder injury, fistulas, infection, pain, and long-term walking difficulty. Symphysiotomy should, therefore, be carried out only when there is no safe alternative. It is advised that this procedure should not be repeated due to the risk of gait problems and continual pain. Abduction of the thighs more than 45 degrees from the midline may cause tearing of the urethra and bladder. If long-term walking difficulties and pain are reported, the patient's condition generally improves with physical therapy.

== Controversial practices in Ireland ==
It is estimated that 1,500 symphsiotomies were performed on women in Ireland, mainly in private Catholic hospitals, between 1944 and 1987. In 2002 an advocacy group called Survivors of Symphysiotomy (SoS) was set up alleging religiously motivated symphysiotomies were performed without consent and against best medical practice in Ireland between 1944 and 1987. In 2014 Ireland agreed to pay women who received the procedure compensation without admitting liability.
