= Osteitis pubis =

- 1. 5 is Pubic symphysis

Osteitis pubis is a noninfectious inflammation of the pubic symphysis (also known as the pubis symphysis, symphysis pubis, or symphysis pubica), causing varying degrees of lower abdominal and pelvic pain. Osteitis pubis was first described in patients who had undergone suprapubic surgery, and it remains a well-known complication of invasive procedures about the pelvis. It may also occur as an inflammatory process in athletes. The incidence and cause of osteitis pubis as an inflammatory process versus an infectious process continues to fuel debate among physicians when confronted by a patient who presents complaining of abdominal pain or pelvic pain and overlapping symptoms. It was first described in 1924.

== Signs and symptoms ==
The symptoms of osteitis pubis can include loss of flexibility in the groin region, dull aching pain in the groin, or in more severe cases, a sharp stabbing pain when running, kicking, changing directions, or even during routine activities such as standing up or getting out of a car. Tenderness on palpation is also commonly present in the adductor longus origin.

== Causes ==
- Pregnancy/childbirth
- Gynecologic surgery
- Urologic surgery
- Athletic activities (e.g. running, football, American football, ice hockey, tennis)
- Major trauma
- Repeated minor trauma
- Rheumatological disorders
- Unknown cause

In the pre-antibiotic era, osteitis pubis was an occasional complication of pelvic surgery, and in particular, of retropubic prostatectomy.

=== Overload or training errors ===
- Exercising on hard surfaces (like concrete)
- Exercising on uneven ground
- Beginning an exercise program after a long lay-off period
- Increasing exercise intensity or duration too quickly
- Exercising in worn out or ill-fitting shoes

=== Biomechanical inefficiencies ===
- Faulty foot and body mechanics and gait disturbances
- Poor running or walking mechanics
- Tight, stiff muscles in the hips, groin, and buttocks
- Muscular imbalances
- Leg length differences

== Diagnosis ==
Osteitis pubis may be diagnosed with an X-ray, where irregularity and widening of the pubic symphysis are hallmark findings. Similar change is also demonstrated with Computed Tomography (CT), but the multi-planar nature of CT has a higher sensitivity than conventional radiography. Though not well visualised on ultrasound (US), thickening of the superior joint capsule with cyst formation is a clue to the diagnosis, as well as secondary changes (i.e. tendinosis) of the adjacent adductor muscles - particularly the adductor longus and rectus abdominis. US is also useful for excluding a hernia, which may co-exist with osteitis pubis and warrant additional treatment.

Both US and CT may be used for injecting the pubic symphysis with corticosteroid as part of an athlete's treatment program. Magnetic resonance imaging combines the diagnostic advantages of CT and ultrasound, also shows bone marrow edema, and has the advantages of not being operator dependent (unlike US), nor using radiation (such as CT and X-rays). As such, MRI is the modality of choice for evaluation, diagnosis, and treatment planning.

== Treatment and prevention ==
Until recently, there was no specific treatment for osteitis pubis. To treat the pain and inflammation caused by osteitis pubis, antiinflammatory medication, stretching, and strengthening of the stabilizing muscles are often prescribed. In Argentina, Topol et al. have studied the use of glucose and lidocaine injections ("prolotherapy", or regenerative injection therapy) in an attempt to restart the healing process and generate new connective tissue in 72 athletes with chronic groin/abdominal pain who had failed a conservative treatment trial. The treatment consisted of monthly injections to ligament attachments on the pubis. Their pain had lasted an average of 11 months, ranging from 3–60 months. The average number of treatments received was 3, ranging from 1–6. Their pain improved by 82%. Six athletes did not improve, and the remaining 66 returned to unrestricted sport in an average of 3 months. Another retrospective study compared exercise-based therapy, corticosteroid injection, and platelet-rich plasma (PRP) injection in football players with MRI-confirmed adductor-related groin pain. Functional outcomes and return-to-sport rates were similar among the three groups, showing no statistically significant differences. Exercise-based therapy alone provided comparable efficacy to injection-based treatments and should be preferred as the first-line conservative option due to its non-invasive and cost-effective nature.

Surgical intervention - such as wedge resection of the pubis symphysis - is sometimes attempted in severe cases, but its success rate is not high, and the surgery itself may lead to later pelvic problems. Recent advances in the field of hip arthroscopy have introduced endoscopic resection of the pubic symphysis which has a potentially higher success rate with fewer complications.

The Australian Football League has taken some steps to reduce the incidence of osteitis pubis, in particular recommending that clubs restrict the amount of bodybuilding which young players are required to carry out, and in general reducing the physical demands on players before their bodies mature.

Osteitis pubis, if not treated early and correctly, can more often than not end a sporting individual's career, or give them an uncertain playing future.

== Epidemiology ==
The incidence of osteitis pubis among Australian footballers has increased sharply over the past decade. There are believed to be three reasons for this:

- The increasing physical demands of Australian rules football. As the game has become more professional, with players becoming full-time athletes, such factors as running speed, kicking length, jumping, and tackling have all increased, placing increasing stress on the pubic region.
- The increasing hardness of the surfaces of football grounds. Grounds are better drained than in the past, and the game is increasingly played in roofed stadiums, in which the grounds receive no rain. Australian football evolved as a winter game played on soft, muddy grounds, and modern surfaces have made muscle and bone injuries more common.
- The increasing demand for size and strength among footballers. This has led young players to concentrate on building muscle mass before their bodies are fully mature. The additional strain that highly developed abdominal muscles place on the pubic bone explains the higher prevalence of osteitis pubis in young players. Some develop the condition while still playing school-level football.

== Pregnancy ==
Damage can occur to the ligaments surrounding and bridging the pubic joint (symphysis) as a result of the hormone relaxin, which is secreted around the time of birth to soften the pelvic ligaments for labor. At this time repetitive stress or falling, tripping, and slipping can injure ligaments more easily. The hormone usually disappears after childbirth and the ligaments become strong again. In some women the weakness persists, and activities such as carrying their baby or stepping up even a small step can cause a slight but continuous separation or shearing in the ligaments of the symphysis where they attach to the joint surfaces, even causing lesions in the fibrocartilage and pubic bones. Symptoms include one or more of the following: pain in the pubic area, hips, lower back, and thighs. This can take months (or even years) to go away.

X-rays taken during the early stages of osteitis pubis can be misleading - pain may be felt, but the damage doesn't appear on the films unless stork views (i.e. standing on one leg) are obtained. As the process continues and progresses, later pictures will show evidence of bony erosion in the pubic bones. Osteitis pubis can also be associated with pelvic girdle pain.
