= Wire saw =

Saw that uses abrasive metal wire or cable

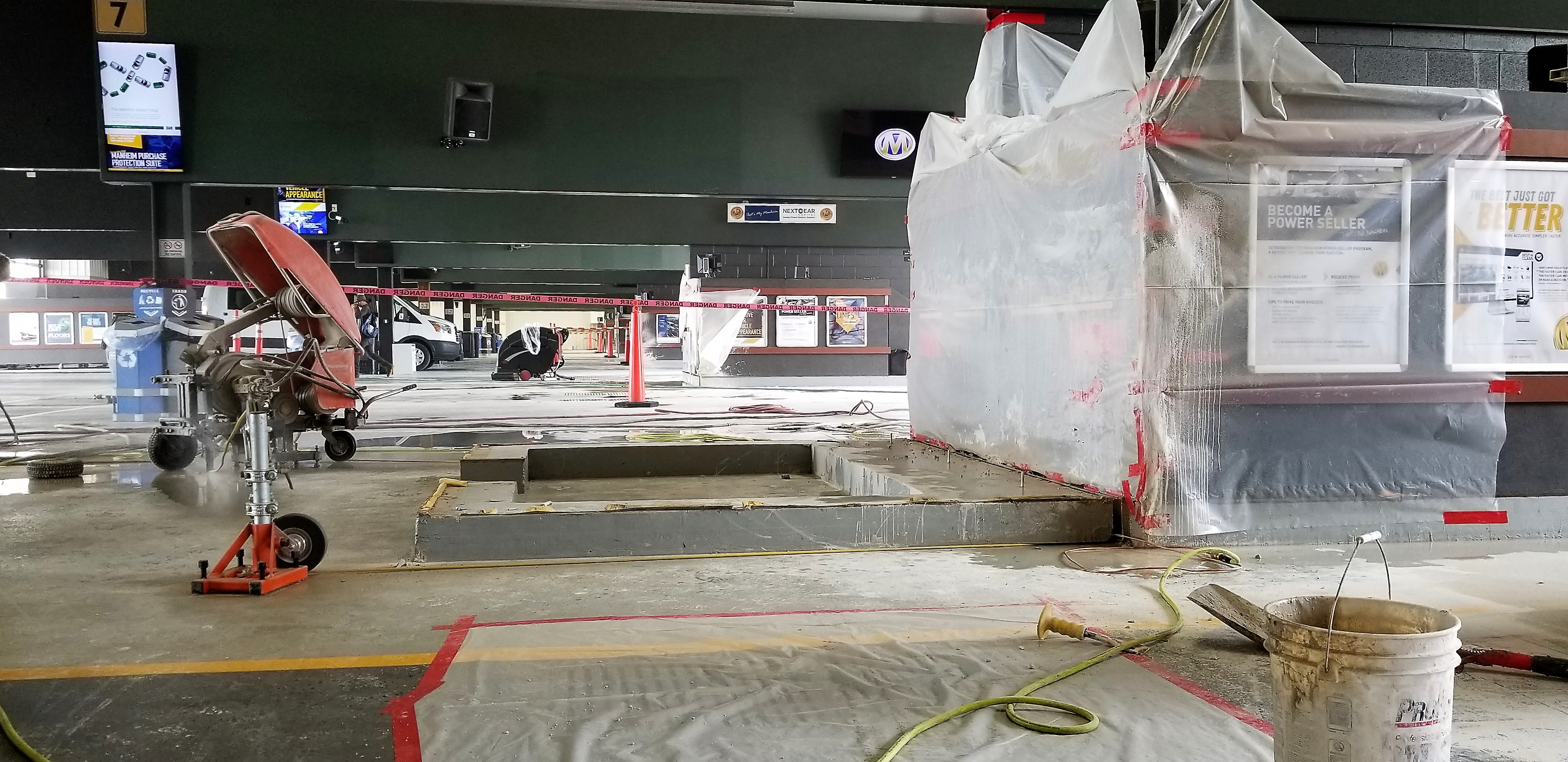
A wire saw being used to remove concrete pad flush with surrounding - wire cutting at bottom-right corner of pad

A wire saw is a saw that uses a metal wire or cable for mechanical cutting of bulk solid material such as stone, wood, glass, ferrites, concrete, metals, crystals etc.. Industrial wire saws are usually powered. There are also hand-powered survivalist wire saws suitable for cutting tree branches. Wire saws are classified as continuous (or endless, or loop) or oscillating (or reciprocating). Sometimes the wire itself is referred to as a "blade".

Wire saws are similar in principle to band saws or reciprocating saws, but they use abrasion to cut rather than saw teeth. Depending on the application, diamond material may or may not be used as an abrasive. The wire can have one strand or many strands braided together (cable). A single-strand saw can be roughened to be abrasive, abrasive compounds can be bonded to the cable, or diamond-impregnated beads (and spacers) can be threaded on the cable. Wire saws are often cooled and lubricated by water or oil.

== Types ==
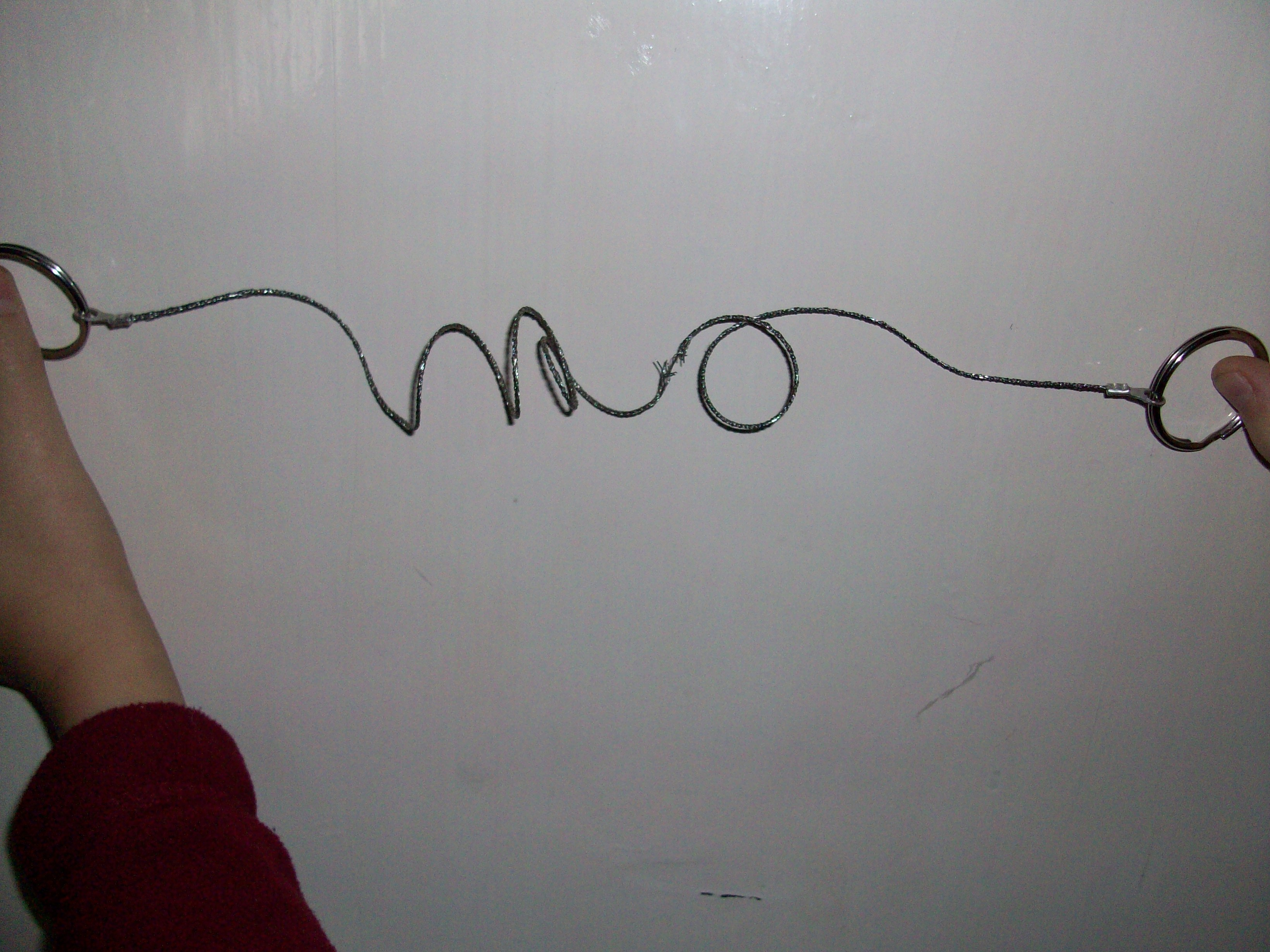
Wilderness Survival Steel Wire Cable Saw

The simplest type of wire saw is the inexpensive "survivalist" (emergency) type intended for sawing branches which are sold in hunting and climbing shops. Continuous type wire saws are used to cut walls and other large constructions. Continuous type saws are used to cut silicon wafers for the semiconductor and photovoltaics industry. Diamond-impregnated wire saws are used in machine shops to cut metal parts.

Precision wire saws are used in laboratories to cut fragile crystals, substrates, and other materials. In addition, the technology can be used for disassembling advanced research structures. For example, Bluegrass Companies designed and fabricated a diamond wire sawing method to dismantle the Tokamak Fusion Test Reactor for the Princeton plasma physics laboratory. Based upon the demonstration at PPPL on the TFTR surrogate, the diamond wire cutting technology is superior to the baseline technology for both cost and safety considerations. The combination of void filling with this cutting technology will significantly reduce personnel radiation exposure through shielding, remote operation (normal application of this technology), and radionuclide stabilization”. Both continuous and oscillating type saws are used to cut intricate shapes in stained glass.

== Materials ==
=== Stone ===
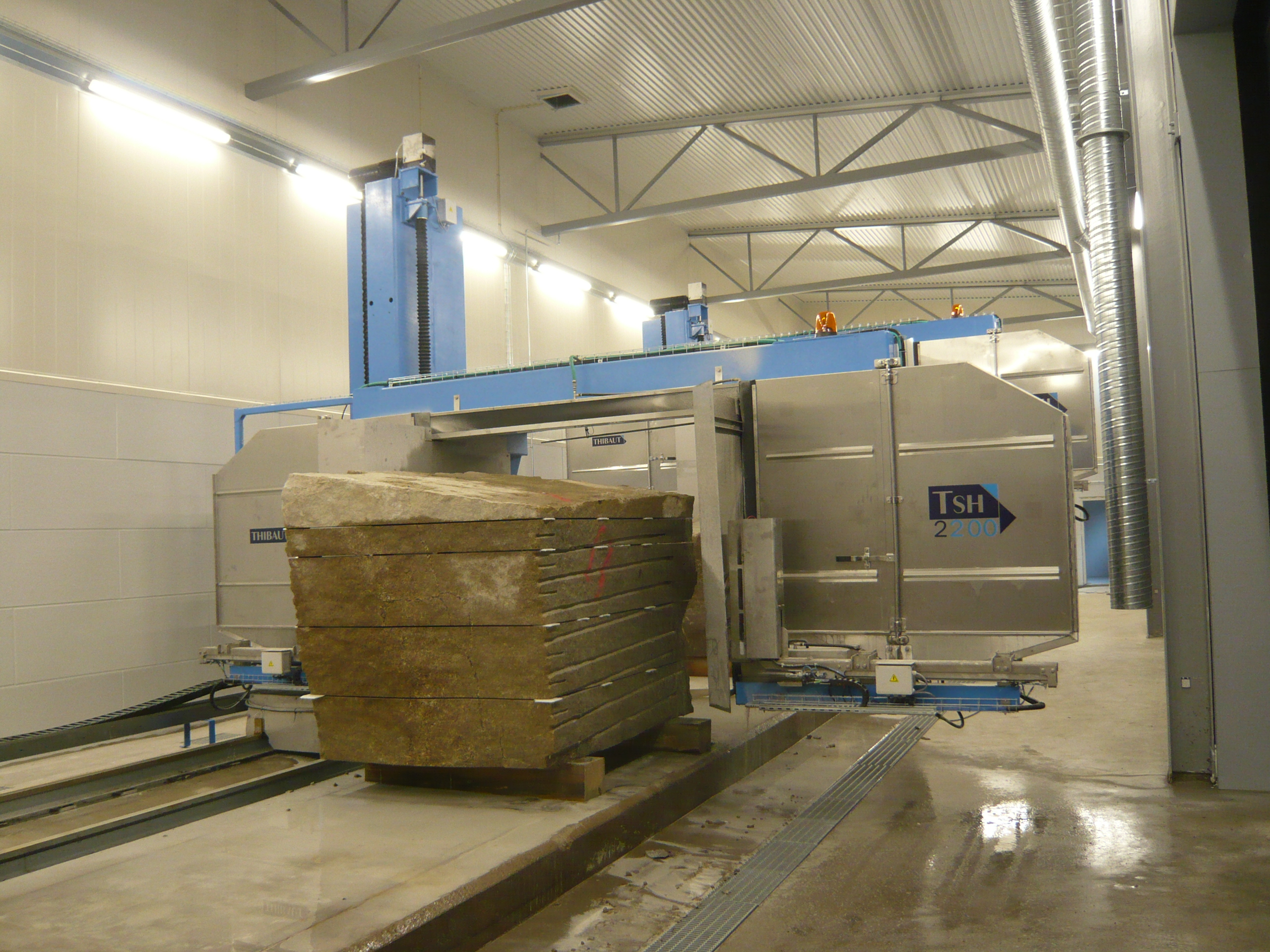
TSH2200 Thibaut wire saw

Mining and quarrying industries commonly use a wire saw to cut hard stone into large blocks that can then be shipped to processing plants to be further refined (in the case of ore dressing) or shipped to distributors (in the case of granite or marble for building). These wire saws are large machines that use diamond-impregnated beads on a cable. The saws allow the bottom of a quarry slab to be cut free (after the cable is passed through access drill holes); with the bottom cut, back and side charges (explosives) can cleanly cleave the slab. Quarry saws on this principle date back centuries; before the era of steel cables with diamond cutters, there were fiber ropes that drew sand through the kerf. The sand (flushed with water) cut the stone (albeit more slowly than diamond does today).

=== Foam ===
Foam manufacturers commonly use an abrasive wire saw, either manual or automatic, to cut foam to certain sizes or certain profiles (shapes). Foam saws are used in many industries, include housing (insulation, pipe insulation), furniture (couches, couch cushions, chair cushions), and entertainment (foam fingers, foam accessories). Abrasive-wire cutting is often done with a computer numerical control device that automatically cuts the pattern (or patterns) that are specified in a two-dimensional (2D) CAD/CAM drawing. The materials to be cut can range from polystyrene, polyethylene, and polyurethane, to high-density or rigid types of foam, such as cellular glass (e.g., Foamglas®). Oscillating saws are used to cut foam rubber.

=== Semiconductors ===
In the semiconductor industry, multi-wire saws are used to cut cylindrical ingots of silicon boules into thin wafers. Thin wire is used to minimize the loss of material. For example, the Peter Wolters DW 291 has a minimum wire diameter of 40 μm and can cut an 860mm work piece into 100 μm wafers.

== Advantages and disadvantages ==
One major advantage of wire saws is their smaller kerf, as compared to a blade. Another is the precision of the cut. Their main disadvantage is the slower speed. Other disadvantages include a greater chance the wire will break and any surface imperfections can cause errors in the cut.

== Diamond wire cutting ==
Diamond wire cutting (DWC) is the process of using wire of various diameters and lengths, impregnated with diamond dust of various sizes to cut through materials. Because of the hardness of diamonds, this cutting technique can cut through almost any material that is softer than the diamond abrasive. DWC is also practical and less expensive than some other cutting techniques, for example, thin diamond wire cost around 10-20 cents per foot ($0.7/m) in 2005 for 140 to 500 micrometer diameter wire, to manufacture and sells around $1.25 a foot ($4.10/m) or more, compared to solid diamond impregnated blade cutters costing thousands of dollars. Thus a 1,000 foot (300 m) spool of diamond wire costs around $200 to manufacture and sells for around $1,250. Selling cost may vary because of wire grade and demand. Other diamond wire cutting can use shaped diamond rings threaded through cables. These larger cables are used to cut concrete and other large projects.

=== Advantages ===
DWC produces less kerf and wasted materials compared to solid blades (slurry wire may be similar). On very expensive materials, this could save hundreds or thousands of dollars of waste. Unlike slurry saws that use bare wire and contain the cutting material in the cutting fluid, DWC uses only water or some fluid to lubricate, cool the cut, and remove debris. On some materials DWC may not need water or cutting fluid, thus leaving a clean dry cut.

=== Disadvantages ===
Using diamond wire for cutting does have the problem of being less robust (snapping when fatigued, bent, jammed or tangling) than solid cutting blades and possibly more dangerous because when the wire breaks it can whip. Because of the unique nature of DWC, most saws are expensive and are tailor-made to handle diamond wire. Commercial saws that utilize solid blades can be augmented with diamond dust blades and thus may be more economical to operate in some areas. Another problem is when the diamond wire breaks in say, the middle of a 3,000 ft (910 m) reel leaving two 1,500 ft (460 m) reels of wire, thus requiring up to twice the saw direction change cycles to do the same cut and wearing out the wire saw and remaining diamond wire quicker. If the diamond wire breaks more towards an end, these shorter pieces (500 ft (150 m) or less) of wire are practically unusable and are commonly disposed of due to the hundreds of feet required to thread the saw, leaving little wire to use for process cutting. Because the diamond abrasive is mechanically attached to the wire, the wire loses cutting effectiveness after a few cuts because most of the abrasive is worn off the wire. This means that the last cut may take much longer than the first cut making production timing less predictable. Diamond wire lasts around six cuts then either breaks in several places or is functionally worn out. The longevity greatly depends on the material cut and the number of slices per cut. Quality control of smaller diameter diamond wire also greatly affects wire life and getting a bad batch is not unknown.

== Surface quality ==
The surface quality in the wire saw process is important for the semiconductor and photo-voltaic industries where the material loss is undesirable. The surface quality is also important in cutting stone and concrete for the construction industry. The wire saw process develops surface roughness on the cut surface. The relation between process parameters (wire speed, feed rate and wire tension) and surface roughness was analyzed in the literature.

== Literature ==
- Teomete, E (2011). "Effect of Process Parameters on Surface Quality for Wire Saw Cutting of Alumina Ceramic". Gazi University Journal of Science. 24 (2). Archived from the original on 2011-07-03.
