= Pubic symphysis diastasis =

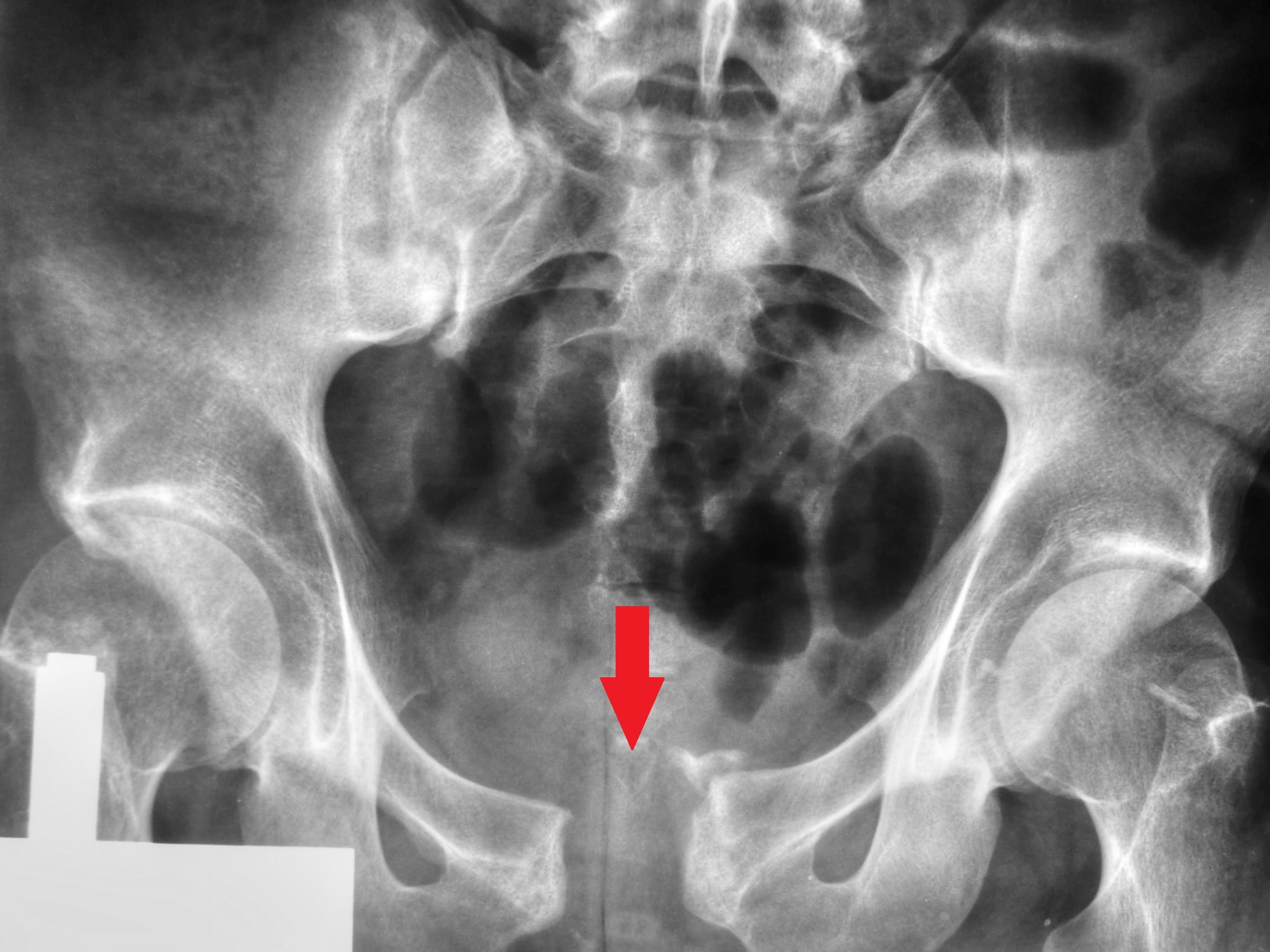
- Post traumatic pubic symphysis diastasis
- Specialty: Orthopaedic

Pubic symphysis diastasis (also known as diastasis symphysis pubis) is the separation of normally joined pubic bones, as in the dislocation of the bones, without a fracture that measures radiologically more than 10 mm. Separation of the symphysis pubis is a rare pathology associated with childbirth and has an incidence of 1 in 300 to 1 in 30,000 births. It is usually noticed after delivery but can be observed up to six months postpartum. Risk factors associated with this injury include cephalopelvic disproportion, rapid second stage of labor, epidural anesthesia, severe abduction of the thighs during delivery, or previous trauma to the pelvis. Common signs and symptoms include symphyseal pain aggravated by weight-bearing and walking, a waddling gait, pubic tenderness, and a palpable interpubic gap. Treatment for pubic symphysis diastasis is largely conservative, with treatment modalities including pelvic bracing, bed rest, analgesia, physical therapy, and in some severe cases, surgery.

== Mechanism ==
A specific cause for the separation of the pubic symphysis during pregnancy and delivery has not been identified by researchers as of date. Thoughts surrounding the hormone relaxin and its effect on the laxity of ligaments during pregnancy have been investigated, but no direct cause of this hormone to pubic symphysis diastasis has been identified. Relaxin, in conjunction with progesterone, can cause a physiological separation of the pubic symphysis during pregnancy that typically measures 3–5 mm and is most pronounced in the first trimester and returns to normal size within five months postpartum.

Risk factors associated with the condition have been identified and include cephalopelvic disproportion, large fetuses, epidural anesthesia, the use of forceps, primigravida, multiple gestations, previous of difficult delivery such as shoulder dystocia, and previous pre-existing pelvic injury or pathology. Risk factors can further be stratified by causes including enzymatic causes such as disturbances in collagen synthesis, endocrine causes related to hormones produced in pregnancy such as progesterone, estrogen and relaxin, inflammatory processes, metabolic disturbances in the production of vitamin D and calcium and pelvic instability such as congenital malformations and excessive lumbar lordosis.

In addition, outside of pregnancy and postpartum states, separation of the pubic symphysis can be seen in the setting of trauma. These cases are related to injuries sustained from high velocity injuries such as motor vehicle accidents, falls from large heights, falling from a horse and crush injuries.

== Signs and symptoms ==
Patients can present with symptoms before, during, or after delivery, and the onset of symptoms can range from postpartum day 1 up to six months postpartum. Often patients present with pain shortly after the cessation of the effects of epidural anesthesia and upon ambulation. Pain is often located in the anterior pelvis and can radiate down the anterior thigh, hip, abdomen, and lower back. Patients will often exhibit tenderness to palpation of the pubic symphysis and symptoms will be exacerbated with specific movements such as the transition from lying down to sitting and standing, climbing stairs, or lifting heavy loads. Patients often are unable to stand on one leg and can exhibit a "waddling" gait.

== Diagnosis ==
Diagnosis of pubic symphysis diastasis is a clinical diagnosis determined by history and physical exam findings in conjunction with radiological findings.

=== History and physical exam ===
Patients often will present to their health care provider with the aforementioned signs and symptoms. In addition, providers can ask patients targeted questions to obtain additional information regarding their pelvic pain. Questions related to specific movements such as climbing stairs, turning in bed, changes in gait and stride length, pain with carrying any weight, or difficulty urinating or defecating should be discussed when obtaining a history of present illness from these patients.

Manual testing by a healthcare professional can also be used. The patient is placed in various positions and pressure is applied in such a way that it provokes pain and maybe movement in the pubis. Physical exam special tests include point tenderness when the pubic symphysis is palpated, a positive Trendelenburg sign, and a positive Patricks Faber test. Practitioners may also appreciate a palpable gap when examining the mons pubis. Other observations may include erythema and swelling to the area as well.

==== Differential diagnosis ====
Other diagnoses that may present similar to pubic symphysis diastasis that must be excluded prior to making a diagnosis include mechanical low back pain, perineal lacerations, sciatica, urinary tract infections, pelvic and lower extremity vein thrombosis, neoplastic processes, septic arthritis, osteomyelitis, pubic osteolysis, and osteitis pubis.

Laboratory tests such as a complete blood cell count looking for elevated white blood cells, inflammatory markers such as lactate, CRP, and ESR, and a urinalysis can help rule out infectious processes that may be causing pelvic pain similar in presentation to pubic symphysis diastasis.

=== Imaging ===
This abnormally wide gap can be diagnosed by radiologic studies such as X-ray, Ultrasound, MRI, CT scan or bone scan. While X-Ray is the gold standard to identify a separation of the pubic symphysis, a decision must be made in regard to which imaging modality to utilize that is patient and case-specific.

==== X-ray ====
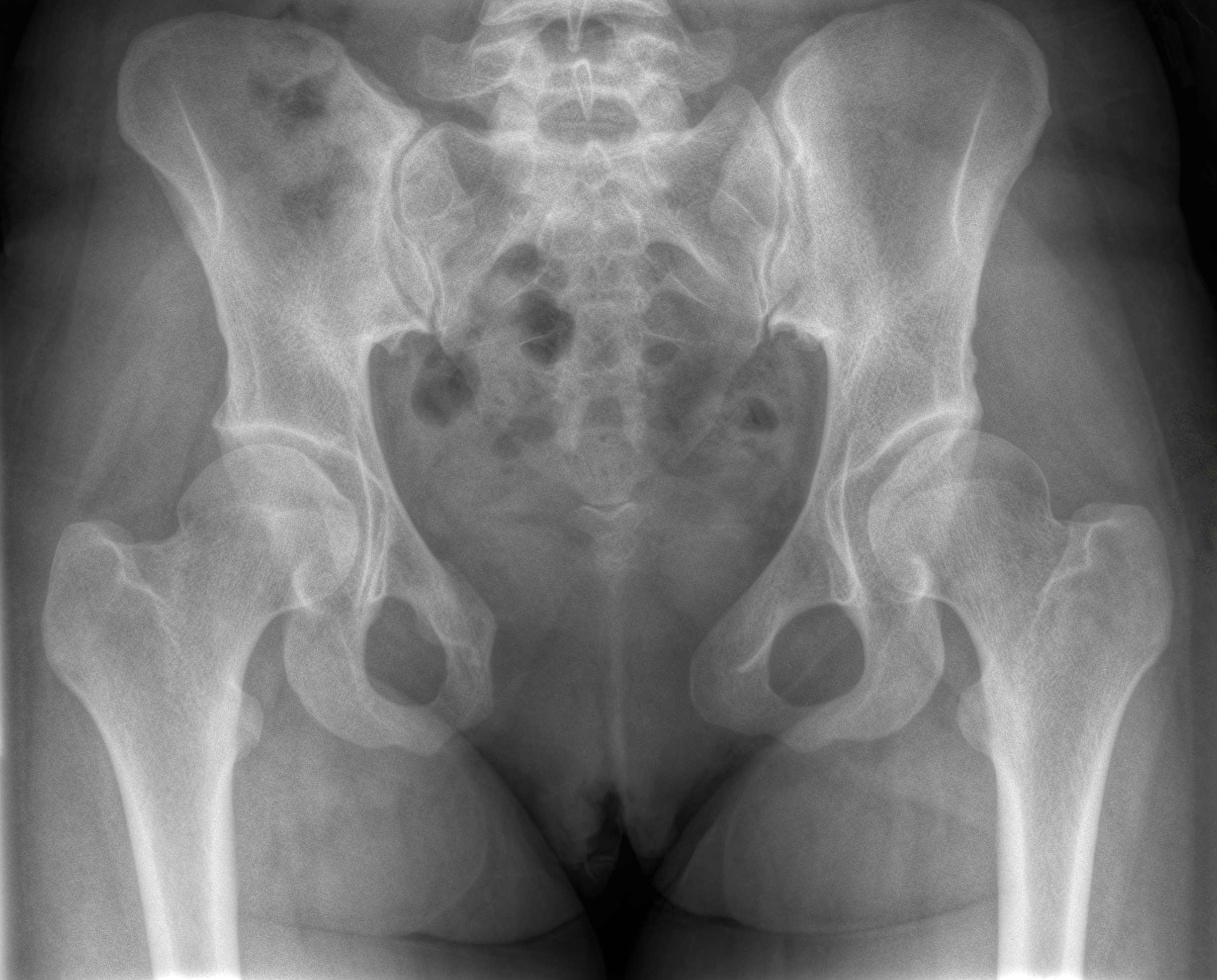
Separation of the symphysis pubis (diastasis)

An X-ray film obtained in the AP view of the pelvic inlet and outlet will show a marked gap between the pubic bones. A normal pelvis will show a gap that is 4–5 mm. However, in pregnancy the hormonal influences cause relaxation of the connecting ligaments and the bones separate up to 9 mm. A gap measuring greater than 10 mm indicates a pathological process.

In addition, a view in the "flamingo stance" can be obtained to demonstrate the instability of the joint. This position consists of the patient standing with weight on one leg and the other bent. A vertical displacement of more than 1 cm is an indicator of symphysis pubis instability. A displacement of more than 2 cm usually indicates involvement of the sacroiliac joints.

A limitation of this imaging study is that X-rays induce radiation and should be avoided during pregnancy.

==== Ultrasound ====
The utilization of ultrasound to identify pathologic widening of the pubic symphysis has recently been studied and identified to be a cost-effective way to obtain imaging of the pubic symphysis, especially in the pregnant population, where the radiation should be avoided.

==== CT scan and MRI ====
Both diagnostic machines can produce detailed cross-sections of the pelvic area. Images will show degrees of soft tissue injury, inflammation of the subchondral region and the bone marrow and any abnormal posturing of the pelvic joints. MRI can show a more detailed view of soft tissue injuries that may be associated with pubic symphysis diastasis, and is radiation-free, thus making this imaging modality ideal for the pregnant patient.

== Management ==
A conservative approach to treatment is initially the management option offered to patients. Conservative treatment includes bed rest, analgesic medications that include anti-inflammatory agents, physiotherapy, and a pelvic brace to provide support and stability.Patients undergoing bedrest typically do so with a pelvic brace in place and are placed in the lateral decubitus position with the application of external heat or ice packs. Attempts at pain control should also be part of the management plan. Acetaminophen is the drug of choice during pregnancy and NSAIDs are typically administered post-partum. In addition, intrasympheseal steroid injections have been shown to provide adequate pain control.

Physiotherapy has also been seen to help improve symptoms of pubic symphysis diastasis. Physiotherapy modalities focused on strengthening deep pelvic and core muscles include mobilization, stabilization, strengthening and pelvic floor exercises. Early implementation of physiotherapy into the treatment plan shortly after the onset of symptoms has been shown to have the best outcomes.

Operative management classically has been reserved for special cases of pubic symphysis diastasis that are shown to have a separation greater than 4 cm, have failed to improve despite conservative management, recurrence of separation after the removal of the pelvic brace, or complications including nerve compression, urogenital tract trauma, or massive bleeding. The peripartum patient is seen to be high surgical risk as patients in the state are hypercoagulable and if left with a prolonged debilitating state, will have trouble caring for their newborn. Thus surgical treatment of pubic symphysis diastasis is largely treated initially with conservative management.

=== Prognosis and subsequent pregnancies ===
Improvement of pain and symptoms from pubic symphysis diastasis is often seen gradually over the span of six weeks with the risk of pain persisting up to six months in patients undergoing conservative treatment. The closure of the symphyseal gap can be seen to be completely resolved on imaging within three months. Pregnant patients that undergo pubic symphysis diastasis have a 33% risk of it recurring with subsequent pregnancies if they undergo vaginal delivery. Cesarean section is often offered to patients by their healthcare providers if the separation measures greater than 15 mm in order to avoid further pelvic and sacroiliac injuries. Also read on physiotherapy special testing for pubic symphysis gapping.
