= Obstructed labour =

Complication during childbirth

- Other names: Labour dystocia
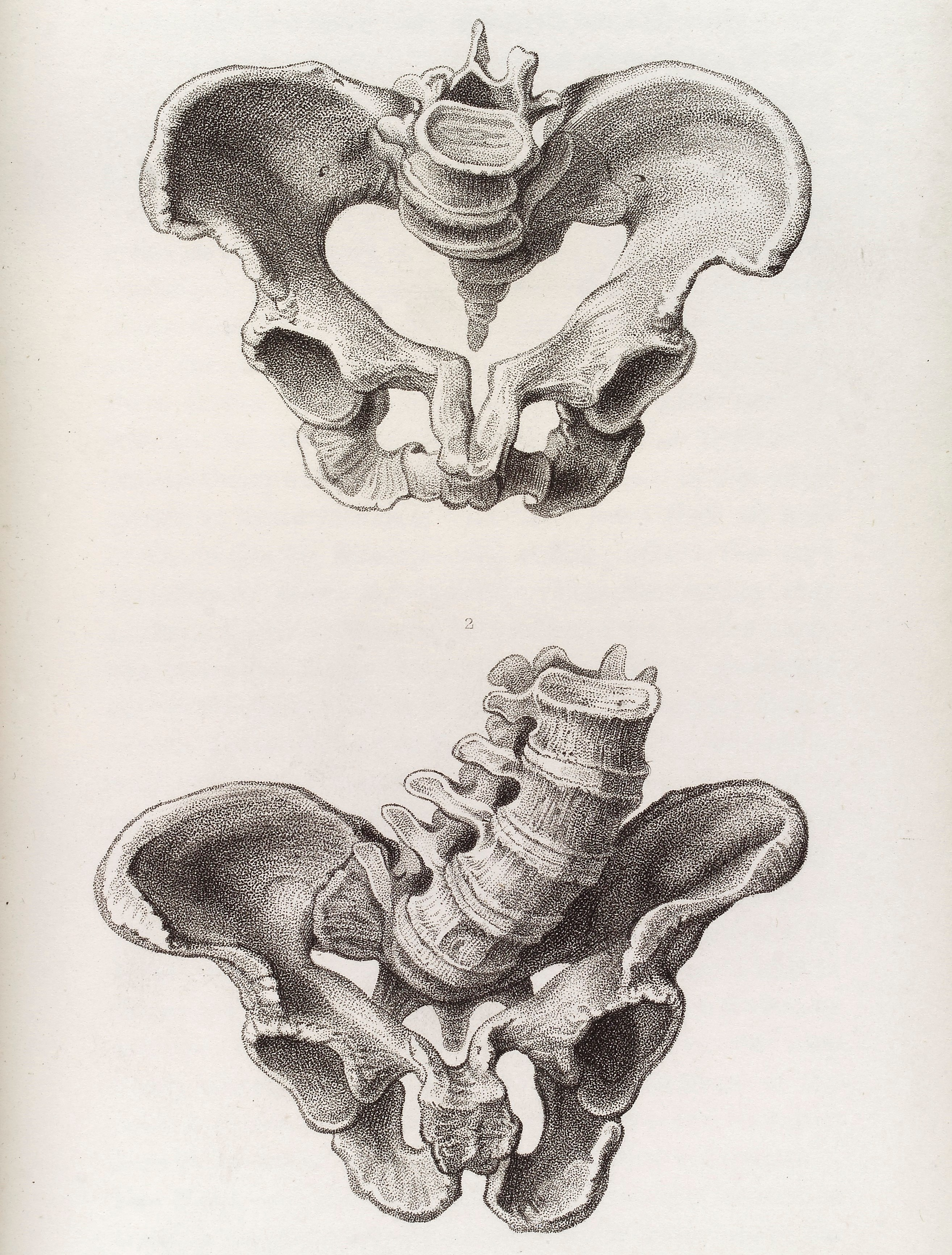
- Illustration of deformed pelvises. A deformed pelvis is a risk factor for obstructed labour
- Specialty: Obstetrics
- Complications: Perinatal asphyxia, uterine rupture, post-partum bleeding, postpartum infection
- Causes: Large or abnormally positioned baby, small pelvis, problems with the birth canal
- Risk factors: Shoulder dystocia, malnutrition, vitamin D deficiency
- Diagnostic method: Active phase of labour > 12 hours
- Treatment: Cesarean section, vacuum extraction with possible surgical opening of the symphysis pubis
- Frequency: 6.5 million (2015)
- Deaths: 23,100 (2015)

Obstructed labour, also known as labour dystocia, is the baby not exiting the pelvis because it is physically blocked during childbirth, although the uterus contracts normally. Complications for the baby include not getting enough oxygen which may result in death. It increases the risk of the mother getting an infection, having uterine rupture, or having post-partum bleeding. Long-term complications for the mother include obstetric fistula. Obstructed labour is said to result in prolonged labour, when the active phase of labour is longer than 12 hours.

The main causes of obstructed labour include a large or abnormally positioned baby, a small pelvis, and problems with the birth canal. Abnormal positioning includes shoulder dystocia where the anterior shoulder does not pass easily below the pubic bone. Risk factors for a small pelvis include malnutrition and a lack of exposure to sunlight causing vitamin D deficiency. It is also more common in adolescence as the pelvis may not have finished growing by the time they give birth. Problems with the birth canal include a narrow vagina and perineum, which may be due to female genital mutilation or tumors. A partograph is often used to track labour progression and diagnose problems. This, combined with physical examination, may identify obstructed labour.

The treatment of obstructed labour may require cesarean section or vacuum extraction with possible surgical opening of the symphysis pubis. Other measures include: keeping the women hydrated and antibiotics if the membranes have been ruptured for more than 18 hours. In Africa and Asia obstructed labor affects between two and five percent of deliveries. In 2015 about 6.5 million cases of obstructed labour or uterine rupture occurred. This resulted in 23,000 maternal deaths down from 29,000 deaths in 1990 (about 8% of all deaths related to pregnancy). It is also one of the leading causes of stillbirth. Most deaths due to this condition occur in the developing world.

== Cause ==
The main causes of obstructed labour include a large or abnormally positioned baby, a small pelvis, and problems with the birth canal. Both the size and the position of the fetus can lead to obstructed labor. Abnormal positioning includes shoulder dystocia, where the anterior shoulder does not pass easily below the pubic bone. A small pelvis of the mother can be a result of many factors. Risk factors for a small pelvis include malnutrition and a lack of exposure to sunlight, causing vitamin D deficiency. A calcium deficiency can also result in a small pelvis, as the structures of the pelvic bones will be weak due to the lack of calcium. A relationship between maternal height and pelvis size is present and can be used to predict the possibility of obstructed labor. This relationship is a result of the mother's nutritional health throughout her life, leading up to childbirth. Younger mothers are also at more risk for obstructed labor due to the growth of the pelvis not being completed. Problems with the birth canal include a narrow vagina and perineum, which may be due to female genital mutilation or tumors. All of these factors lead to a failure in the progress of labor.

=== Evolution ===
Obstructed labor is more common in humans than any other species and continues to be a main cause of birth complications today. Modern humans have morphologically evolved to survive as bipeds, however, bipedalism has resulted in skeletal changes that have consequently narrowed the pelvis and the birth canal. The combination of increased brain size and changes in pelvic structure are the major contributors of obstructed labor in modern humans. It is also common for obstructed labor in humans to be caused by the fetus's broad shoulders. However, morphological shifts in pelvic structure still account for the inability of a fetus to pass effectively through the birth canal without major complications

Other primates have a wider and straighter birth canal that allows a fetus to pass through more effectively. Mismatch between birth canal size and infant cranial width and length due to bipedal locomotion requirements have often been referred to as the obstetric dilemma, since compared to other great apes, modern humans have the greatest disproportion between infant cranial size and birth canal size. Shrinking of upper extremities and curvature of the spine have also affected the way modern humans give birth. Quadruped apes have longer upper limbs that allow them to reach down and pull their fetus out of the birth canal unassisted. Modern humans' shorter upper extremities and the evolution of bipedal locomotion may have placed a premium on assistance during labor. For this reason, researchers argue that assisted labor may have evolved with bipedalism. Obstructed labor has been documented as a complication of childbirth since the field of obstetrics originated. For over 1,000 years, obstetricians have had to forcibly remove obstructed-labor fetuses to prevent the death of the mother.

Before the existence of the cesarean section, fetuses that were obstructed had a low survival rate. Even in the 21st century, if obstructed labor is left untreated, it could result in mother and infant death. Although surgical removal of the fetus is the preferred method of managing obstructed labor, manual removal using medical tools is also common.

== Diagnosis ==
Obstructed labour is usually diagnosed based on physical examination. Ultrasound can be used to predict malpresentation of the fetus. In the examination of the cervix once labor has begun, all examinations are compared to regular cervical assessments. The comparison between the average cervical assessment and the current state of the mother allows for a diagnosis of obstructed labor. An increasingly long time in labor also indicates a mechanical issue that is preventing the fetus from exiting the womb.

== Prevention ==
Access to proper health services can reduce the prevalence of obstructed labor. Less developed areas have inadequate health services to attend to obstructed labor, resulting in a higher prevalence in these areas. Improving the nutrition of females, both before and during pregnancy, is important for reducing the risk of obstructive labor. Creating education programs about reproduction and increasing access to reproductive services such as contraception and family planning in developing areas can also reduce the prevalence of obstructed labor.

== Treatment ==
Before considering surgical options, changing the posture of the mother during labor can help to progress labor. The treatment of obstructed labour may require cesarean section or vacuum extraction with possible surgical opening of the symphysis pubis. Caesarean section is an invasive method, but it is often the only method that will save the lives of both the mother and the infant. Symphysiotomy is the surgical opening of the symphysis pubis. This procedure can be completed more rapidly than Caesarean sections and does not require anesthesia, making it a more accessible option in places with less advanced medical technology. This procedure also leaves no scars on the uterus, making further pregnancies and births safer for the mother. Another important factor in treating obstructed labor is monitoring the energy and hydration of the mother. Contractions of the uterus require energy, so the longer the mother is in labor, the more energy she expends. When the mother is depleted of energy, uterine contractions become weaker, and labor will become increasingly longer. Antibiotics are also an important treatment as infection is a possible result of obstructed labor.

== Prognosis ==
If cesarean section is obtained promptly, the prognosis is good. Prolonged obstructed labour can lead to stillbirth, obstetric fistula, and maternal death. Fetal death can be caused by asphyxia. Obstructed labor is the leading cause of uterine rupture worldwide. Maternal death can result from uterine rupture, complications during caesarean section, or sepsis.

== Epidemiology ==
In 2013, it resulted in 19,000 maternal deaths, down from 29,000 deaths in 1990. Globally, obstructed labor accounts for 8% of maternal deaths.

== Etymology ==
The word dystocia means 'difficult labour'. Its antonym is eutocia (Ancient Greek: εὖ, romanized: eu, lit. 'good' + Ancient Greek: τόκος, romanized: tókos, lit. 'childbirth') 'easy labour'.

Other terms for obstructed labour include difficult labour, abnormal labour, difficult childbirth, abnormal childbirth, and dysfunctional labour.

== Other animals ==
The term can also be used in the context of various animals. Dystocia pertaining to birds and reptiles is also called egg binding.

In part due to extensive selective breeding, miniature horse mares experience labor dystocia more frequently than other breeds.

Most brachycephalic dogs require caesarean sections to decrease the risk of mortality for both the bitch and puppies. In the Boston Terrier, French Bulldog, and the Bulldog, more than 80% of births require caesarean sections.

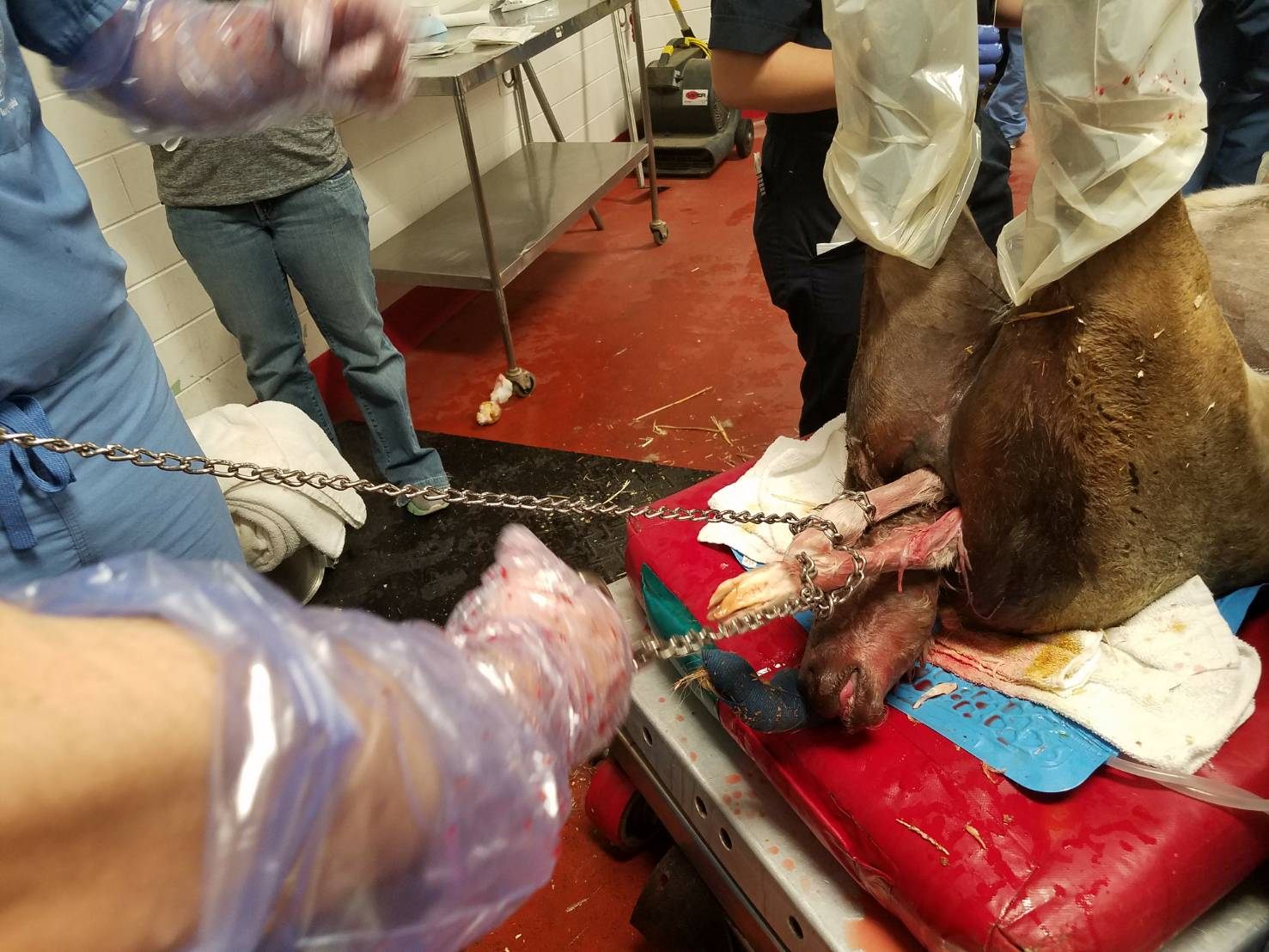
Assisted delivery: miniature horse dystocia. Note the position of the head.

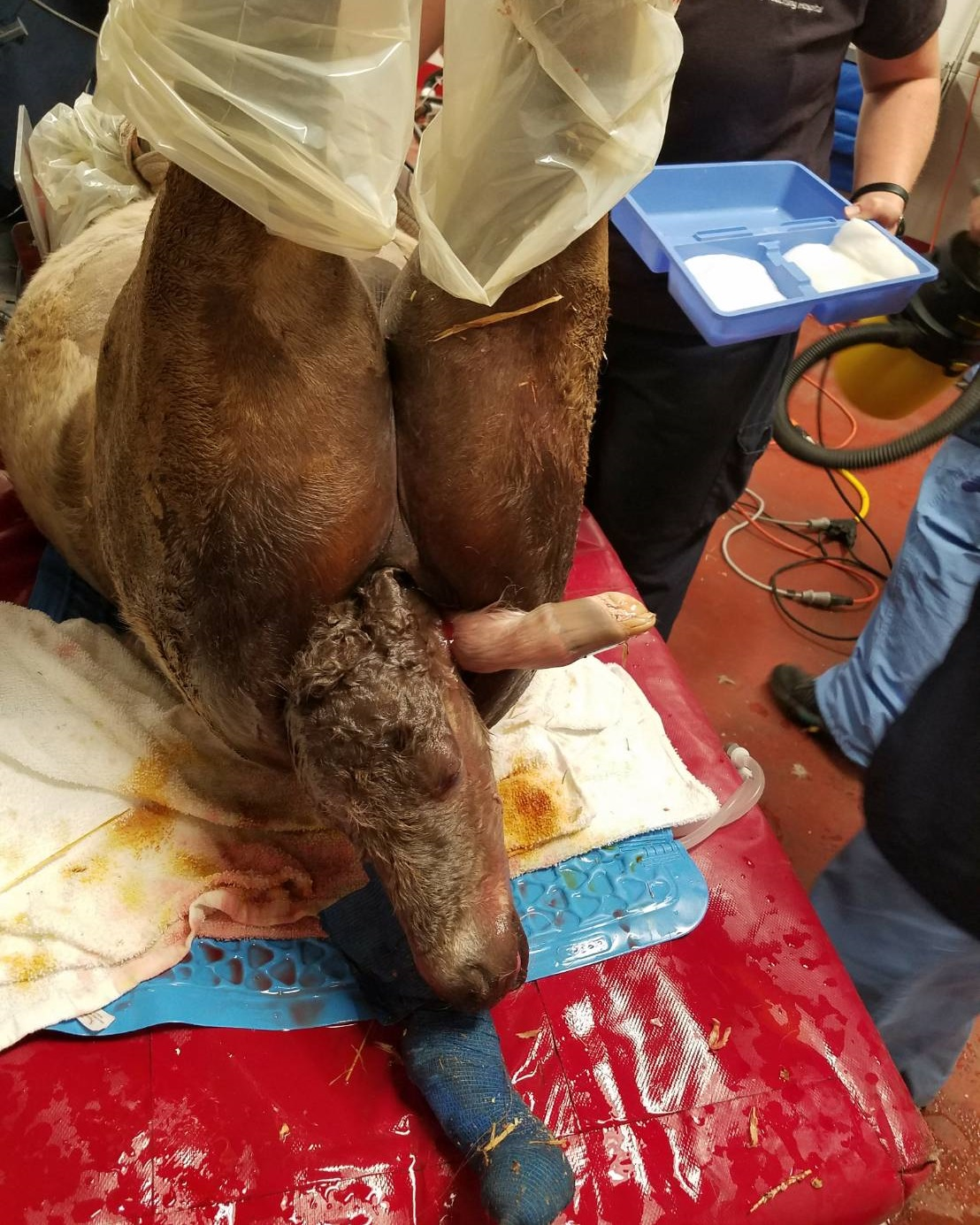
Miniature horse dystocia. Note the position of the head.
