= Graz tube weaning model =

The Graz tube weaning model (German: Graz Sondenentwöhnung) is a method that supports parents, caregivers and professionals to help and empower medically fragile children with early and post-traumatic eating behavior disorders, particularly tube dependency.

== Overview ==
Enteral feeding via a tube (nasogastric tube, PEG or jejunostomy) is commonly used in the treatment of premature infants and young children to support them during periods of severe illness and health disorders when a child is unable to swallow food safely. In specific cases, tube feeding is a necessary intervention, however, it can cause problems when it comes to tube weaning and resuming an oral diet.

Children may suffer from food aversion when fed without a tube and resist natural oral feeding. This effect is caused by a combination of physical and psychological disorders, which are addressed during a tube weaning program.

The Graz tube weaning model was developed by a multidisciplinary team based at the Children's Hospital, Graz during the 1990s and first published in 2000.

== Medical uses ==
Tube weaning program is specifically designed for premature infants and children who are fed via a nasogastric, nasojejunal, gastrostomy or jejunostomy tube. The treatment is performed either when the feeding tube is no longer needed or if children experience side effects and poor response to enteral feeding. The program is suitable both for primary weaning and children that had been unsuccessfully weaned in the past. It is especially recommended for children that are struggling with oral feeding or have developed tube dependency.

== Contraindications ==
Tube weaning is contraindicated in children who do not have a safe swallowing response. It is not recommended if there is a high possibility of an upcoming surgery or intervention that will require further usage of a feeding tube.

== Medical risks ==
One of the medical risks is weight loss. Losing up to 10% of a child's weight is expected in the transition from exclusive enteral feeding to oral intake and is acceptable during the initial phase of treatment.

There's also risk of choking and aspiration. Children are assessed for risk of choking and aspiration prior to starting the tube weaning process and are excluded from learning to eat if aspiration or choking is a medically confirmed finding.

== Techniques ==
The original technique is an intense 3-week inpatient treatment program. The child is admitted to the unit with at least one parent or caregiver and has ongoing input from multiple therapists, as well as medical rounds several times a day and 24-hour support from nursing and medical staff. This method is especially suitable for children with co-existing, notable health issues when close medical supervision is highly recommended.

The child and parent/caregiver attend multiple therapy sessions:

- Developmental psychology and play sessions, including puppet interactions to assess and treat attachment disorders.
- Physiotherapy which is aimed to improve motor tone and self-feeding movements.
- Occupational therapy to improve tactile ability and coordination and acclimatize the child to ‘biological’ textures.
- Speech and language therapy to introduce non-traumatic oral stimulation to oro-facial area as well as being involved in assessment of swallowing.
- Developmental psychotherapy sessions with the child and sessions for parents on request, working on management of past traumatic experiences, parent-child attachment issues and relationship stresses.
- Nutrition counseling is intense educational support regarding future diet in terms of adequate caloric and nutritional intake for the child's growth and condition needs.

The treatment includes daily play picnic, which is usually lasts one hour. Children spend time in a room where food is attractively portioned/positioned and usually served on the floor. Using a psychoanalytically based play therapy, children may choose to examine, touch or taste the available food. According to the program, children must become self-motivated and no encouragement or distraction is received from parents. Parents’ interactions are monitored by video and one-way mirrors with positively-framed feedback given after each session. During the rest of the time, food is freely available to the child with no offering or encouragement. Since its development, the method has been modified so that children can attend on an outpatient basis, or treated remotely by a net coaching program.

== Recovery ==
Studies in 2001 and 2010 have shown a 95% (n=62) and 92% (n=221) success rate respectively (success being defined as obtaining all nutrition orally) in children treated with this approach. Follow-up contacts show that fully weaned children have increased BMIs when measured after treatment compared to when they were entirely tube fed. 2014 study compared inpatient treatment and Netcoaching approaches and showed 90.5% (n=169) and 81.3% (n=209) success rates respectively.
