= Ladder to the Moon =

British charitable organization

Ladder to the Moon is a United Kingdom-based social enterprise that works with healthcare organisations to enhance the quality of residential care for those living with dementia and old age, through the use of creativity, coaching, training and consultancy.

== Relationship Theatre ==
Relationship Theatre is a registered trademark developmental model pioneered by Ladder to the Moon to help caregivers interact more successfully with individuals living with dementia, learning disabilities and advanced old age.

The process involves professional actors and coaches experienced in social care, who creatively coach and interact with staff, residents and volunteers in care homes. Movie-based scenarios are played out, with the aim of fostering a greater level of engagement with residents.

Relationship Theatre programmes are designed to become integrated with the day-to-day running of the care environment, and have been successfully run in several British care homes.

== CCSEP ==
The Ladder to the Moon Culture Change Studio Engagement Programme (CCSEP) is a staff training approach to improve staff involvement and communication with the elderly in their care. It is based on a positive psychology framework, using activities involving theatre and film. It has been shown to be effective if a supportive network is established.

== History ==
Ladder to the Moon has its headquarters in London and was established in 2002. It was established as a charity, but in 2013 it became a registered Community Interest Company in England and Wales, company number 8417544. It has been supported by British Department of Health Innovation and Social Enterprise funds and was a finalist at the National Dementia Care Awards in 2011. Ladder to the Moon's Managing Director, Chris Gage, was named Care Innovator of the Year in the Greater London Care Awards in 2013.

Ladder to the Moon was also one of the founder members of the National Skills Academy for Social Care.

== See also ==
- Caregiving and dementia
- Dementia
- Elderly care
- Relationship Theatre
