= Dementia caregiving =

Form of caregiving

Dementia caregiving is the ongoing physical, social, emotional support provided to people living with dementia, helping them carry out everyday activities.

As the global population ages, there is an increasing number of people living with dementia and those who provide care. Care may be formal, delivered by trained professionals in hospitals, nursing homes, or through home-care services, or informal, provided without pay by family members or friends. Most people with dementia are being cared for by their family, however, as the condition advances, professional nursing at home or in long-term residential care is often required.

Caregiving for people with dementia includes medical, psychological, and social dimensions. Common approaches and issues include person-centered care, considering the effects of the physical environment, difficulties in communication, pain assessment and incontinence care.

The wellbeing of caregivers themselves is an important aspect of dementia caregiving. Long-term informal caregiving is associated with wide-ranging impacts on physical and mental health and on financial circumstances, collectively described as caregiver burden. Formal caregivers, such as nurses in acute or community settings, also face increased risk of burnout. A range of interventions can help alleviate burden and improve wellbeing. Effective measures include complementary formal services, training and psychoeducation, psychological therapies such as cognitive behavioural therapy, and support groups.

== Care types and settings ==
=== Informal caregiving ===
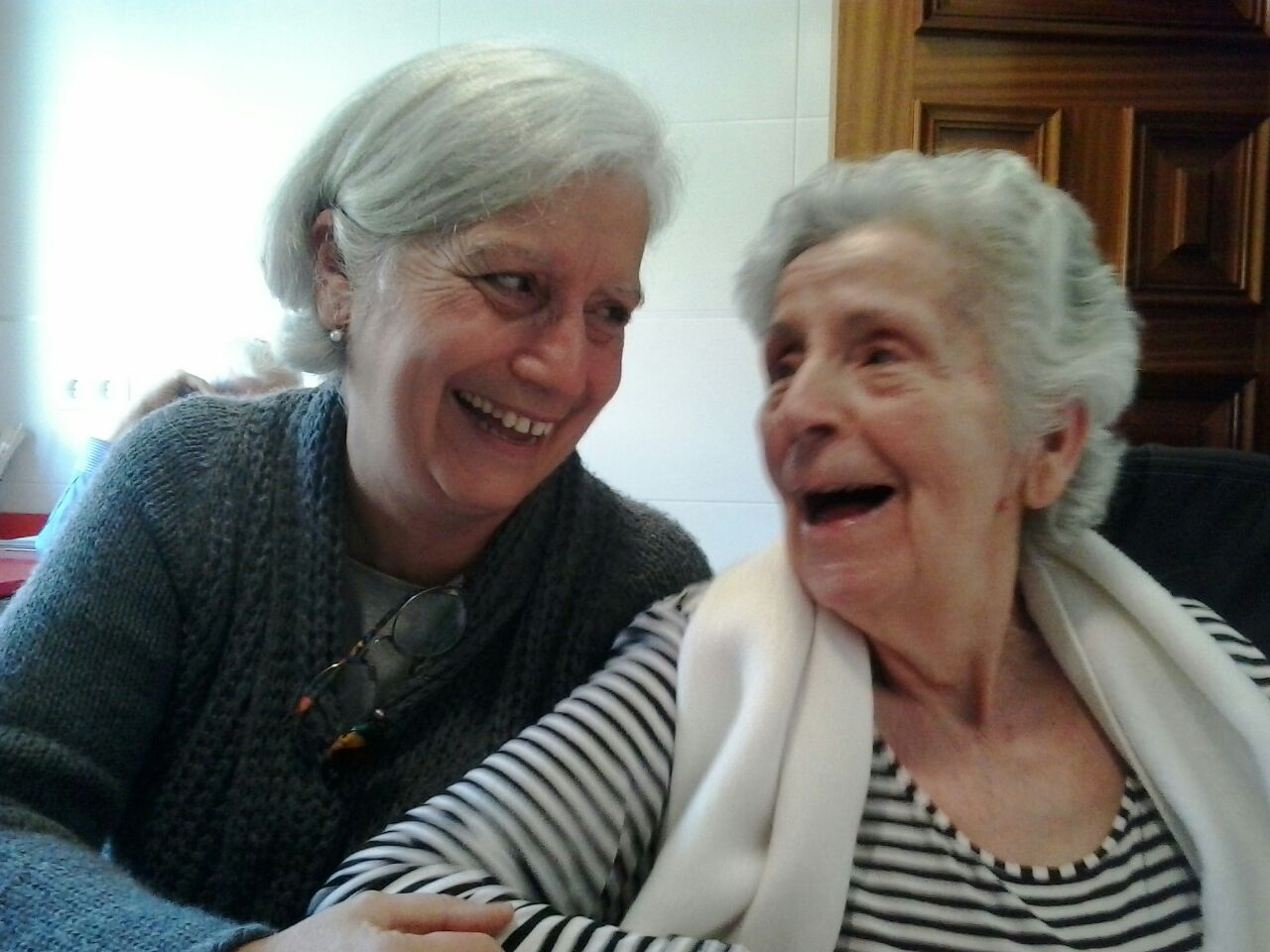
A woman and her mother with dementia in Barcelona, Spain

Family caregivers (also known as informal or unpaid caregivers) are relatives, partners or friends who provide care for people struggling with their everyday activities due to age, long-term illness or disability. The majority of people living with dementia are cared for by their families or unpaid carers, especially in low- and middle-income countries. The role of family carers is widely recognised as vital for the wellbeing of people with dementia. They provide physical, social, emotional, and financial support.

=== Formal caregiving ===
Formal caregivers (also known as paid caregivers) are trained professionals, including care workers at hospitals, day-care centers and nursing homes; home care and respite care providers; healthcare assistants; and other unlicensed assistive personnel. Formal services are typically used when the disease has already progressed. Reasons for not receiving formal care early on include people with dementia refusing such services, family members preferring to provide care themselves, lack of information from doctors about available services, and socioeconomic barriers such as living in rural areas.

== Approaches and interventions ==
People living with dementia have complex and diverse needs, so caregiving must include medical, psychological, and social dimensions.

=== Psychological and psychosocial therapies ===
Offering personally tailored activity sessions to people with dementia in long-term care homes may help manage challenging behavior. No evidence supports the idea that activities are more effective when they match individuals' interests. At the same time, a program showed that simple measures, like talking to people about their interests, can improve the quality of life for care home residents living with dementia. These measures reduced residents' agitation and depression and led to fewer GP visits and hospital admissions, making the program cost-saving.

=== Memory strategies ===
The episodic memory of people with Alzheimer's declines progressively. However, memories tied to strong emotions are more likely to be retained, so emotional memory can be a useful tool in day-to-day caregiving. Reminiscence and life story work are also useful - rather than focusing on a person's dementia or the benefits of capturing information before it is forgotten, life story work has been shown to get people thinking about the fact that they may actually have interesting stories to tell.

A range of assistive technology devices aims to help people with dementia manage memory issues. However, it is not yet clear whether these products are beneficial for memory problems.

=== Physical environment ===
Performing everyday activities is challenging for those living with dementia, and this affects their physical and mental health. The quality and design of the physical environment where they are cared for can play a major role in supporting their wellbeing and independence, and can relieve some of the burden on caregivers.

When receiving care in an acute care setting (such as hospitals), the unfamiliar environment can be particularly challenging for people living with dementia. They often experience healthcare institutions as overstimulating, overcrowded and lacking privacy. Combined with the physical issue leading to admission, the absence of family and familiar surroundings heightens anxiety, confusion, and distress. The lack of personal space also makes engagement in daytime activities harder.

A person-centered care approach helps alleviate some of the stress of being in an unfamiliar acute-care environment and can also benefit those caring for people with dementia in this setting. Implementing best practice in dementia care requires a hospital-wide approach. Increasing workforce capacity, designing physical environments that support familiarization and social interaction, establishing inclusive caregiver policies, and building knowledge-sharing cultures have all shown promise in improving dementia care in the acute-care setting.

==== Environmental design ====
Architects designing for aging in place can consider the relationship of the built environment to the functioning and well-being of seniors and create safe and stimulating environments for people with dementia. The environment where those with dementia eat their meals should be inviting and foster conversation and socialization.

=== Communication ===
Caring for someone with dementia is especially challenging because their ability to speak or otherwise communicate may become impaired, and they may seem unable to understand what is said to them. Since people with dementia typically have trouble communicating their needs, this can also be frustrating for caregivers. Communication challenges affect not only the administration of pain medication but also hydration, nutrition, and all aspects of physical and emotional care. Formal caregivers may also find it hard to form relationships with those they care for because of the communication barrier.

Care approaches such as person-centered care attempt to address the difficulty in communication between caregivers and people with dementia.

For people with dementia who have lost their speech, nonverbal communication can be used. Paying attention to eye movements, facial expressions, and body movements can help caregivers understand them better. As each person is affected by dementia differently, a unique form of communication may need to be established. Being nonverbal does not mean a person no longer wishes to participate in the world around them.

People with dementia living in long-term care homes typically have high rates of hearing loss which can further impair communication between them and staff. Care addressing hearing issues might involve hearing aids, personal sound amplification products, adjustments to the environment, and using specific communication techniques. However, various barriers, including a lack of knowledge and time pressure, often prevent staff from providing adequate hearing care.

==== Therapeutic lying ====
Therapeutic lying (also known as therapeutic fabrication, deception, or fibbing) and validation therapy are tools that caregivers might use to reassure people with dementia that they are okay.

These strategies are often challenging, as caregivers might not feel comfortable "lying" to their loved ones. It is important for families and professional caregivers to realize that the approach is not really lying but meeting the person in their reality. Often, these are lies of omission. For example, if a person with advanced dementia has forgotten that a beloved family member died years ago, then it is potentially unhelpful to tell them that the loved one has passed away, especially if they are unlikely to remember this "new" information and may ask again in a few minutes.

=== Pain assessment ===
When caring for elderly people who are cognitively impaired, it is challenging to assess whether they are experiencing pain. Missed nursing care is common in patients with dementia. Some nurses may prioritize other patients based on the stage of their dementia and their age. Missed care could lead to complications such as falls, infections, and incontinence.

Several approaches can help prevent inadequate pain recognition in elderly people with dementia. Interpreting body language can be effective in identifying discomfort. Another way to improve perceptions of pain is to get to know the patient better through family members' eyes. Obtaining further information about the patient from family members helps make the connection to normal behaviors.

=== Incontinence care ===
People with dementia are more likely to have problems with incontinence. They are three times more likely to experience urinary and four times more likely to experience fecal incontinence compared to people of similar ages. This can have a profound impact on the dignity and quality of life of people with dementia and their caregivers.

There is a general lack of understanding and stigma around incontinence. Professionals also lack knowledge and training when it comes to incontinence in people with dementia. Poorly managed incontinence also has a severe negative impact physically, psychologically, economically, and socially on people with dementia living at home and their informal caregivers.

Professional guidelines suggest that treatment should always be preferred to containment, as pads and catheterization can be uncomfortable and negatively affect the person's dignity. However, the continence problems of people with dementia are different than those of those without, and the care strategy should take their and their caregivers' different perspectives into account. There are guidelines for the continence care needs of people with complex health conditions, such as the Continence Care Framework.

For people with dementia living at home, incontinence care can be improved by early clinical assessment (rather than using pads); promoting continence through a balanced diet, exercise, and hand hygiene; encouraging and helping toilet use; and a sensitive management of incontinence to secure the person's dignity.

In care home settings, continence care needs to be individualized with the aim of promoting personal dignity. New measures should take into account the preferences and personal history of the affected person. Appropriate diet and mobility can help, and prompts to go to the toilet should be preferred over using pads. To support and encourage toilet use, staff need practical training and an understanding of how dementia affects continence.

In a hospital context, the care of continence is often poor. This can lead to worse clinical outcomes for people with dementia, a higher risk of infection, and the development of urinary and fecal incontinence. After a clinical assessment, a personalized continence plan should be created, which includes identifying reversible causes and contributing factors. Staff need to be sensitive to the affected people's specific verbal and non-verbal cues, as they might have difficulties expressing their needs around continence. The language used should respect dignity and shouldn't cause embarrassment.

=== Assistive technologies ===
As part of dementia caregiving, assistive technologies may be used to improve the quality of life for individuals with dementia, support their independence, and assist caregivers. These technologies include home automation systems, digital assistive tools, and wearable sensors.

Artificial intelligence has been explored as a tool to support decision making in dementia care. The use of AI in caregiving is not yet in full effect; however, the Alzheimer's Society is working to develop more reliable pieces of technology that can be used in clinical settings. Different pieces of technology, such as machine learning systems and robots, are being designed to encourage independence, by providing reminders and assisting during the completion of different tasks. While these technologies are being looked into, developing and deploying AI-powered tools is costly, and there is a shortage of data on people with dementia for proper training of AI models. Another downside to implementing this kind of AI-powered care means that there will now be greater surveillance of people with dementia, raising potential concerns about the loss of autonomy they would have.

Companion robots provide social interaction and emotional support for dementia patients. Designed to engage users through conversation, movement, and tactile interactions, these robots can help reduce agitation, loneliness, and anxiety, enhance mood, and promote engagement in daily activities. For example, Paro, a robotic seal, has demonstrated positive effects in dementia care by offering soothing responses to touch and sound. This is a simple solution to issues, like behaviors, that clinicians face everyday. Another companion based tool, Sunny, has been used to decline cognitive declination through the use of simple conversation and memory recognition. These robots are able to keep people, who were once unable to remember someone's name, engaged with their environment, providing numerous benefits to their overall health.

Telemedicine involves the use of digital communication tools to provide healthcare services remotely. In dementia care, it enables healthcare professionals to conduct consultations and monitor patients without the need for in-person visits. Telemedicine can also support caregivers by providing remote guidance and assistance, helping to manage care more efficiently and reduce the need for frequent visits to healthcare facilities.

=== In mental health wards ===
People with dementia may be admitted to a mental health (psychiatric) ward when they become very distressed or when their behaviour puts them, or others, at risk. This usually happens when the situation cannot be managed safely at home, in a care home, or on a general hospital ward. People admitted to these wards often have more advanced dementia and may also have other long-term health problems. An admission aims to work out why the person has become distressed, address any underlying problems, and support them to become more settled and stable.

Carers, such as family members, friends, or partners, play an important role during an admission. They often know the person’s routines, likes and dislikes, and ways of communicating, which can help staff provide more personalised care. However, carers are not always involved as much as they would like to be. Common concerns include limited communication from staff, restricted involvement in assessment and discharge planning, and inconsistent visiting arrangements.

== Caregiver wellbeing ==
=== Informal caregivers ===
==== Negative impacts of caregiving ====
Caring for a loved one can have positive effects on the caregiver, for example, feelings of mutuality, personal growth, and increased family cohesion. However, providing long-term, unpaid care for someone with dementia can also have wide-ranging negative effects on carers' physical and mental health and on their financial situation. Witnessing the decline of a loved one's cognitive and functional abilities can be emotionally distressing and overwhelming. Providing care for someone with dementia can be physically and financially demanding, especially as the disease progresses and the individual may require assistance with activities of daily living such as bathing, dressing, toileting, and feeding. The sum of physical, emotional, social, and financial challenges experienced by caregivers is referred to as caregiver burden.

Caregiving responsibilities can limit informal caregivers' ability to engage in social activities, maintain relationships, and pursue personal interests. Many caregivers lack adequate support from family members, friends, healthcare providers, and community resources. Feeling unsupported or misunderstood can compound the challenges of caregiving and increase feelings of burden. Informal, unpaid caregivers frequently experience loneliness, social isolation, alienation, and difficulties reconciling their own needs with their role as caregiver. Many feel overwhelmed by caregiving responsibilities.

The financial cost of caring for a family member can be substantial, including expenses for medical care, medications, in-home care services, assisted living facilities, and other related costs. Caregivers are more likely to reduce their work hours or leave their jobs entirely to provide care, leading to loss of income and financial strain. They also face difficulties when trying to re-enter employment later on.

The complexity and emotional and financial impact of being a family caregiver often cause psychological distress, including depression, anxiety, guilt, and can also contribute to physical health issues.

==== Support and interventions ====
There are various forms of support, services, and interventions that may improve the wellbeing of family caregivers. Receiving psychological therapies and attending support groups can be effective in supporting the mental health of family caregivers. Cognitive behavioral therapy (CBT) can have positive effects on caregiver burden and grief. CBT, mindfulness-based cognitive therapy, behavioral activation, and acceptance and commitment therapy can be effective in treating depression in informal caregivers.

The different forms of services and interventions can also be combined into multicomponent interventions which often improve caregiver wellbeing more than their components separately. An example of an effective multicomponent intervention for family caregivers is the START (STrAtegies for RelaTives) program. START consists of 8 sessions delivered one-to-one by psychologists. The sessions using methods from cognitive behavior therapy include education about dementia, psychoeducation of stress coping skills, and teaching relaxation. When tested in the United Kingdom, the START program effectively reduced anxiety and depression in family caregivers.

Caring for individuals causes different mental issues among caregiver: depression and other mental illnesses, alike. To help caregivers deal with this, different institutions have created Adult Day Cares; there, caregivers are relieved of having to provide care, giving them time for themselves. These have been proven to reduce burnout among caregivers, ensuring the quality of care remains at a higher level.

===== Complementary formal care =====
Using ongoing formal care services to substitute some of the caregiving can ease the burden on family caregivers. These complementary formal services can include home care, day care, personal assistants, and programs like Meals on Wheels. Regularly used services of this kind can have a positive impact on caregivers' employment, enabling them to continue working alongside caregiving.

Another form of complementary formal care is respite care which is designed to provide short breaks and relief to caregivers through the temporary provision of substitute care. Even though many caregivers value respite care and express their satisfaction with it, the service does not seem to result in long-term improvements in emotional wellbeing. This contradiction might be explained by the respite care providing only occasional and temporary relief, after which caregivers return to the unchanged demands of long-term caregiving.

===== Training and education =====
Given the complex and wide-ranging needs of people with dementia, caregivers require specific knowledge and skills to provide effective care. However, family caregivers often lack knowledge about the disease and its progression, and how to deliver care. Even when information is available, it is typically difficult to understand.

Education and training for family caregivers can cover the nature of dementia, caregiving techniques, communication skills, and stress-coping methods. Providing education and training for family caregivers can reduce some of their burden. However, these are more likely to be effective when caregivers are actively participating in the process instead of passively receiving information. Psychoeducation for informal caregivers is effective in reducing burden and anxiety, and in helping caregivers process grief.

As informal caregivers living in low- and middle-income countries might not look at dementia care through the concept of burden, providing knowledge about dementia caregiving can raise their awareness about this approach. In turn, this might encourage them to seek help and have positive effects on their mental health.

=== Formal caregivers ===
Formal caregivers of people with dementia have a higher chance of experiencing burnout. Stress and burnout experienced by nurses in acute or community care settings have a negative impact on the quality of services for people with dementia. Conversely, improving the workplace environment for nurses can improve the care they deliver to people with dementia.

== End-of-life decisions ==
End-of-life decisions for people with dementia present ethical, medical and emotional challenges.

=== Assisted dying ===
The practice of assisted dying in dementia cases raises ethical concerns, including the potential for abuse and the challenge of ensuring informed consent. Some scholars argue that the practice is fraught with cultural and ethical pitfalls, suggesting that it may not be widely or safely endorsed. Safeguards, such as thorough assessments of patient competence and the presence of clear, voluntary, and well-considered advance directives, are essential to uphold ethical standards in end-of-life care.

Family members often play a crucial role in end-of-life decisions for individuals with dementia. Their perspectives can influence the consideration of assisted dying, especially when the patient's wishes are documented in advance directives.

In jurisdictions where physician-assisted dying (PAD) or euthanasia is legal, such as the Netherlands and Belgium, the role of advance directives and family involvement is significant. In the Netherlands, research examining attitudes toward PAD in dementia cases found that 74% of families found euthanasia permissible for incapacitated patients if an advance directive was in place. However, implementing such directives can be ethically and legally complex, particularly when patients lose decision-making capacity.

== By country ==
=== United Kingdom ===
There are around 700,000 people in the UK who provide unpaid care for a family member or a friend living with dementia. The total spending on dementia care is estimated to be £42 billion per year. More than 60% of these costs are paid by people with dementia and their family caregivers. People with dementia spend an average of £100,000 on their own care over their lifetime. 70% of unpaid carers in the UK report that providing dementia care negatively affected their mental and physical health.

==== Inequalities ====
Depending on where they live in the UK and their personal characteristics such as ethnicity and financial background, people with dementia can face systematic disadvantages when it comes to timely diagnosis and access to quality care. For example people living with dementia in rural areas are less likely to receive a formal diagnosis, and those coming from ethnic minorities have more difficult access to care and worse outcomes after receiving it. Socioeconomic factors such as education, income and home ownership also produce barriers to accessing care and are associated with lower quality of life, satisfaction and wellbeing.

=== United States ===
Nearly 13 million people in the United States are informal carers for people with dementia. In 2025, they provided more than 19 billion hours of care. While the majority of informal caregivers are family members, approximately 12% are community members such as neighbors or friends.

== See also ==
- Carers' rights
- Direct support professional
- Unlicensed assistive personnel
