= No More Sunsets =

- No More Sunsets: The Last Days of a Meth Addict
- Directed by: Chip Rossetti
- Written by: Chip Rossetti
- Starring: Shawn Bridges
- Distributed by: Rossetti Productions
- Release date: March 12, 2006
- Running time: 29 minutes
- Country: United States
- Language: English

No More Sunsets is a 2006 American short documentary film starring former trucker Shawn Bridges and filmed by Chip Rosetti at the former's request.

The 29-minute black-and-white film presents a warning to children about the drug meth by way of an object lesson: the ravage of Bridges' long-time meth use and its effects on his family. At the time of filming Bridges was near-catatonic, bedridden with a catheter and a feeding tube, dying at the age of 34. His father was quoted as saying that he had the body of a 70- 80-old man.

Shawn Bridges used meth for most of his adult life, suffering his first heart attack at the age of 26. By the time he eventually quit, it became clear that the damage done was lethal. He had intended the film to be shown at his local church; instead, it sparked international attention and media coverage. Bridges died in late March 2007, aged 35. At the time, Rosetti stated that he had sold 500-600 copies and was planning on a sequel.
