= Buried bumper syndrome =

- Specialty: Gastroenterology
- Symptoms: Asymptomatic, tube dysfunction
- Complications: Bleeding, infection, abscess, peritonitis
- Usual onset: >1 year after G tube placement
- Causes: Excessive tightening of the external bumper
- Risk factors: Obesity, weight gain, malnutrition, corticosteroid therapy, and poor wound healing.
- Diagnostic method: Upper endoscopy
- Treatment: Gastrostomy tube removal
- Frequency: 0.3–2.4% of people with a G-tube

Buried bumper syndrome (BBS) is a condition that affects feeding tubes placed into the stomach (gastrostomy tubes) through the abdominal wall. Gastrostomy tubes include an internal bumper, which secures the inner portion of the tube inside the stomach, and external bumper, which secures the outer portion of the tube and opposes the abdomen. Buried bumper syndrome occurs when the internal bumper of a gastrostomy tube erodes into the wall of the stomach. The internal bumper may become entirely buried within the fistulous tract. The main causative factor is excessive tightening of the external bumper, leading to increased pressure of the internal bumper on the wall of the stomach. Additional risk factors include: obesity, weight gain, malnutrition, corticosteroid therapy, and poor wound healing.

Buried bumper syndrome may be entirely asymptomatic, though tube dysfunction is common. The gastrostomy tube may leak around the entry site, or it may become difficult to infuse feeds, fluids or medications. Less often, bleeding, infection, abscess or peritonitis may occur. Diagnosis is achieved most often with upper endoscopy. Computed tomography imaging may also confirm the diagnosis. Treatment consists of removal of the gastrostomy tube, either via simple external traction or endoscopic removal. Surgery is rarely necessary.

== Signs and symptoms ==
Buried bumper syndrome may be asymptomatic, especially early in the course. Dysfunction of the tube occurs commonly, including leakage around the insertion site, inability to administer feedings or fluids, or need for more pressure when giving feeds. Buried bumper syndrome may cause abdominal pain or swelling (erythema) at the site of insertion of the PEG tube. Less commonly, buried bumper syndrome may also be complicated by acute infectious illness (sepsis), abscess formation, gastrointestinal bleeding or peritonitis. In some cases, the internal bumper may be felt by palpating the abdomen. Inspection of the tube typically reveals an inability to easily rotate the tube.

== Cause ==
Buried bumper syndrome occurs when this internal bumper erodes into the wall of the stomach, sometimes becoming entirely buried within the wall of the stomach. Buried bumper syndrome tends to be a late complication of gastrostomy tube placement, but can rarely occur as early as 1 to 3 weeks after tube placement. Most cases occur more than 1 year after initial placement of the PEG tube.

Excessive tightening of the external bumper is the primary risk factor for buried bumper syndrome. Maintaining the external bumper in a loose position may help prevent buried bumper syndrome. Additional risk factors include obesity, medications, poor wound healing, malnutrition, etc. Feeding tubes with soft balloon internal bumpers are less likely to cause buried bumper syndrome, compared with more firm or stiff polyurethane internal bumpers.

== Diagnosis ==
Buried bumper syndrome may be suspected based on features consistent with this disorder. The diagnosis is confirmed either endoscopically (via upper endoscopy) or with computed tomography. Upper endoscopy may reveal overgrowth of stomach tissue over the internal bumper (incomplete buried bumper syndrome). If the bumper has eroded deep into the gastric mucosa, it may not be visualized during endoscopic evaluation (complete buried bumper syndrome).

== Prevention ==
Prevention consists of maintaining a space of 1–2 cm between the external bumper of the gastrostomy tube and the abdominal wall, which avoids excess pressure of the internal bumper onto the stomach wall. Mobilizing and rotating the tube may prevent mucosal overgrowth and aid in avoiding buried bumper syndrome.

== Treatment ==
Treatment of buried bumper syndrome consists of removal of the gastrostomy tube. For mild cases with externally removable tubes, simple external traction may be used to remove the tube. Several different approaches may be utilized, including endoscopy. If endoscopic removal is pursued, a new feeding tube may be placed during the same procedure. Where endoscopic removal is not possible, surgery may be necessary (laparoscopic or laparotomy).

== Epidemiology ==
Buried bumper syndrome occurs in 0.3–2.4% of patients. Malnutrition, malignancy, chemoradiation, and corticosteroid therapy are additional risk factors.

== History ==
In 1980, the first percutaneous endoscopic gastrostomy (PEG) tube was reported, as an alternative to an open surgical placement of feeding tubes. The first cases of buried bumper syndrome were reported in 1988 and 1989. The term "buried bumper syndrome" was first used in 1990.

== See also ==
- Percutaneous endoscopic gastrostomy
