= Family Caregiver Alliance =

American nonprofit organization

- Abbreviation: FCA
- Registration no.: 94-2687079
- Legal status: 501(c)(3)
- Purpose: To improve the quality of life for caregivers and the people who receive their care
- Headquarters: San Francisco, California
- Executive Director: Kathleen A. Kelly
- Website: caregiver.org

Family Caregiver Alliance (FCA) is a national nonprofit caregiver support organization headquartered in San Francisco, California. FCA's purpose is to "improve the quality of life for caregivers and the people who receive their care."

== History ==
The Family Survival Project was founded in the 1970s by family members of relatives with brain disorders. In 1978, the project received a state grant to research how many adult-onset, brain-damaged people were impacted and the services available. The Family Survival Project became the Bay Area's Caregiver Resource Center, and was the predecessor of FCA. In 1980, the California legislature funded a pilot project to provide support for caregivers. FCA was awarded the pilot project, which it ran for three years. The organization supported chronic brain disorders through education, support and assistance with planning.

In 1984, the legislature passed a law establishing a statewide system of resource centers for caregivers, replicating a pilot project developed by FCA. California created a system of Caregiver Resource Centers through the Comprehensive Act for Families and Caregivers of Brain-Impaired Adults, which operates under the state health department. The state named FCA as a consultant through a contract with the state mental health department to oversee a system of Caregiver Resource Centers.

In 2001, the National Center on Caregiving was established at FCA to advance the development of high-quality, cost-effective programs and policies nationwide that support and sustain the important work of families and friends caring for loved ones with chronic, disabling health conditions.

"California was the first state in the nation to establish a statewide network of support organizations for caregivers; every resident has access to a CRC in their area". The California Department of Healthcare Services promotes the list of Caregiver Resource Centers on FCA's website.

== Activities ==
Today, FCA acts as a single point-of-entry for access to services and information for California's family caregivers, and as a clearinghouse for caregiver information throughout the US. FCA provides an online library of educational publications, webinars and videos for families needing practical help when care-giving. The organization is recognized for providing guidance and resources for caregivers. FCA also provides family consultants to advise caregivers and their families.

The organization has a research arm, the National Center on Caregiving, which is also headed by Executive Director Kathleen Kelly. In 2016, Kelly was recognized with an "Influencer in Aging" award from Next Avenue, a nonprofit media website produced for PBS.

FCA is cited in professional journals for its statements about caregivers. A consumer health journal recommended the information provided by FCA as excellent "for caregivers new to the role, or seasoned caregivers seeking additional information", stating that FCA's website "can stand alone as a primary source for family care-giving information."

== Finances ==
For fiscal year ending June 30, 2018, FCA reported total revenue of $3,700,124, including $1,811,392 in government grants. The organization gave a total of $60,000 in grants to other organization for assistance with a program on Alzheimer's.
