= Respite care in the United States =

In the United States there are approximately 50 million people who are caring at home for family members including elderly parents, and spouses and children with disabilities and/or chronic illnesses. Without this home-care, most of these cared for would require permanent placement in institutions or health care facilities.

== Respite care ==
An estimated 50 million family caregivers nationwide provide at least $306 billion in uncompensated services—an amount comparable to Medicare spending in 2004 and more than twice what is spent nationwide on nursing homes and paid home care combined. Family caregivers may suffer from physical, emotional, and financial problems that impede their ability to give care now and support their own care needs in the future. Without attention to their needs, their ability to continue providing care may well be jeopardized.

Respite care is one of the services that Alzheimer's caregivers say they need most. One study found that if respite care delays institutionalization of a person with Alzheimer's disease by as little as a month, $1.12 billion is saved annually. A similar study in 1995 found that as respite use increased, the probability of nursing home placement decreased significantly

U.S. businesses also incur high costs in terms of decreased productivity by stressed working caregivers. A study by MetLife estimates the loss to U.S. employers to be between $17.1 and $33.6 billion per year. This includes replacement costs for employees who quit because of overwhelming caregiving responsibilities, absenteeism, and workday interruptions.

=== Caregiver wellness reduces hospitalizations, doctor visits, work absences ===
Significant percentages of family caregivers report physical or mental health problems due to caregiving. A recent survey of caregivers of children, adults and the disabled conducted by the National Family Caregivers Association, found that while 70% of the respondents reported finding an inner strength they didn't know they had, 27% reported having more headaches, 24% reported stomach disorders, 41% more back pain, 51% more sleeplessness and 61% reported more depression.

Three fifths of family caregivers aged 19–64 surveyed recently by the Commonwealth Fund reported fair or poor health, one or more chronic conditions, or a disability, compared with only one-third of non caregivers. Caregivers reported chronic conditions at nearly twice the rate of non caregivers (45% to 24%).

A 1999 study in The Journal of the American Medical Association found that participants who were providing care for an elderly individual with a disability and experiencing caregiver strain had mortality risks that were 63% higher than non-caregiving controls.

In an Iowa survey of parents of children with disabilities, a significant relationship was demonstrated between the severity of a child's disability and their parents missing more work hours than other employees. They also found that the lack of available respite care appeared to interfere with parents accepting job opportunities.

=== Respite for younger family members with disabilities ===
Respite has been shown to improve family functioning, improve satisfaction with life, enhance the capacity to cope with stress, and improve attitudes toward the family member with a disability.

In a 1989 US national survey of families of a child with a disability, 74% reported that respite had made a significant difference in their ability to provide care at home; 35% of the respite users indicated that without respite services they would have considered out-of-home-placement for their family member.

There was a statistically significant reduction in somatic complaints by in a study of primary caregivers of children with chronic illnesses, and a decrease in the number of hospitalization days required by children, as a direct result of respite care.

Data from an ongoing research project of the Oklahoma State University on the effects of respite care found that the number of hospitalizations, as well as the number of medical care claims decreased as the number of respite care days increased.

A Massachusetts social services program designed to provide cost-effective family-centered respite care for children with complex medical needs found that for families participating for more than one year, the number of hospitalizations decreased by 75%, physician visits decreased by 64%, and antibiotics use decreased by 71%.

An evaluation of the Iowa Respite Child Care Project for families parenting a child with developmental disabilities found that when respite care is used by the families, there is a statistically significant decrease in foster care placement.

A 1999 study of Vermont’s then 10-year-old respite care program for families with children or adolescents with serious emotional disturbance found that participating families experience fewer out-of home placements than nonusers and were more optimistic about their future capabilities to take care of their children.

=== Results when caregivers of the elderly use respite ===
Respite for the elderly with chronic disabilities in a study group resulted in fewer hospital admissions for acute medical care than for two other control groups who received no respite care

Sixty-four percent of caregivers of the elderly receiving 4 hours of respite per week, after one year, reported improved physical health. Seventy-eight percent improved their emotional health, and 50% cited improvement in the care recipient as well. Forty percent said they were less likely to institutionalize the care recipient because of respite.

Caregivers of relatives with dementia who use adult day care experience lower levels of caregiving related stress and better psychological well-being than a control group not using this service. These differences were found in both short-term (3 months) and long-term (12 months) users.

=== Respite provided across the lifespan yields positive outcomes ===
In a 2004 survey conducted by the Oklahoma Respite Resource Network, 88% of caregivers agreed that respite allowed their loved one to remain at home, 98% of caregivers stated that respite made them a better caregiver, 98% of caregivers said respite increased their ability to provide a less stressful environment, and 79.5% of caregivers said respite contributed to the stability of their marriage.

When newly formed, the Nebraska statewide lifespan respite program conducted a statewide survey of a broad array of caregivers who had been receiving respite services, and found that one in four families with children under 21 reported that they were less likely to place their child in out-of-home care once respite services were available. In addition, 79% of the respondents reported decreased stress and 58% reported decreased isolation.

Data from an outcome based evaluation pilot study show that respite may also reduce the likelihood of divorce and help sustain marriages

== The Lifespan Respite Act ==
Recognizing this significant contribution and the needs faced by America's caregivers, the United States Congress passed The Lifespan Respite Care Act of 2006 (HR 3248) which was signed into law in December 2006. The bill was introduced and championed in the US House of Representatives by Rep. Mike Ferguson and James Langevin (D-RI). A companion bill in the Senate was cosponsored by Senator Hillary Clinton (D-NY) and Senator John Warner.

Much of the success for the passage of this legislation is due to the work of The Lifespan Respite Task Force which includes a diverse group of national and state organizations, state respite and crisis care coalitions; health and community social services; disability, mental health, education, faith, family caregiving and support groups; groups from the child advocacy and the aging community; and abuse and neglect prevention groups.

If and when the new law is funded, (check progress at the ARCH website) it will provide funds for states to develop lifespan respite programs to help families access quality, affordable respite care. Lifespan respite programs are defined in the Act “as coordinated systems of accessible, community-based respite care services for family caregivers of children and adults with special needs.” Specifically, the law authorizes funds for:

- Development of state and local lifespan respite programs
- Planned or emergency respite care services
- Training and recruitment of respite care workers and volunteers
- Caregiver training

When the bill passed the House, Rep. Ferguson, whose own father was a caregiver for his ill mother for six years said, “Today's action by the House of Representatives represents not only an important victory for family caregivers nationwide, but it also sends America's caregivers a clear message: Your selfless sacrifice is appreciated, and help is on the way.”

The Lifespan Respite Care Act of 2006 is based on model state lifespan respite programs that have successfully addressed all of these barriers. Three states have enacted legislation to implement lifespan respite programs (Oregon, Nebraska, Wisconsin), which establish state and local infrastructures for developing, providing, coordinating and improving access to respite for all caregivers, regardless of age, disability or family situation. Oklahoma has also implemented a successful lifespan respite program.

== See also ==
- Healthcare in the United States
