= Family caregivers =

Carers for disabled people

Family caregivers (also known as family carers, informal or unpaid caregivers) are relatives or friends who provide care for people struggling with their everyday activities due to age, long-term illness or disability. Unlike their formal counterparts, informal caregivers are unpaid and have no professional background in caregiving. They provide physical, social, emotional, and financial support. The role of family carers is widely recognised as vital for the wellbeing of people with conditions like dementia.

There are more than 250 million family caregivers globally. In 2019, informal caregivers of people with dementia provided 133 billion hours of care. The majority of people living with dementia are cared for by their families or unpaid carers, especially in low- and middle-income countries.

== Caregiver wellbeing ==
=== Negative impacts of caregiving ===
Caring for a loved one can have positive effects on the caregiver, for example, feelings of mutuality, personal growth, and increased family cohesion. However, providing long-term, unpaid care for someone can also have wide-ranging negative effects on carers' physical and mental health and on their financial situation. The sum of physical, emotional, social, and financial challenges experienced by caregivers is referred to as caregiver burden. Witnessing the decline of a loved one's cognitive and functional abilities can be emotionally distressing and overwhelming. Providing care for someone can be physically and financially demanding, especially when the individual may require assistance with activities of daily living such as bathing, dressing, toileting, and feeding.

Caregiving responsibilities can limit informal caregivers' ability to engage in social activities, maintain relationships, and pursue personal interests. Many caregivers lack adequate support from family members, friends, healthcare providers, and community resources. Feeling unsupported or misunderstood can compound the challenges of caregiving and increase feelings of burden. Informal, unpaid caregivers frequently experience loneliness, social isolation, alienation, and difficulties reconciling their own needs with their role as caregiver. Many feel overwhelmed by caregiving responsibilities.

The financial cost of caring for a family member can be substantial, including expenses for medical care, medications, in-home care services, assisted living facilities, and other related costs. Caregivers are more likely to reduce their work hours or leave their jobs entirely to provide care, leading to loss of income and financial strain. They also face difficulties when trying to re-enter employment later on.

The complexity and emotional and financial impact of being a family caregiver often cause psychological distress, including depression, anxiety, guilt, and can also contribute to physical health issues.

=== Support and interventions ===
There are various forms of support, services, and interventions that may improve the wellbeing of family caregivers. Effective measures include complementary formal services, training and psychoeducation, psychological therapies such as cognitive behavioural therapy, and support groups. These different approaches can also be combined into multicomponent interventions.

== By country ==
=== United States ===
In the United States, approximately 63 millions Americans provide unpaid care to an older adult or person with a chronic health condition. The average age of family caregivers in the United States is 51 years old. Women make up the majority of the caregiver population. Of that majority, 61% identify as Non-Hispanic White individuals, compared to 16% identifying as Latino/a/e, 13% Black, and 6% Asian American, Native Hawaiian, and Pacific Islander. For caregivers that are older, the person they usually take care of are their spouses, while younger caregivers often care for older adults (e.g., their parents).

== Society and culture ==
=== Social psychology of caregiving ===
Informal caregiving for someone with an acquired disability entails role changes that can be difficult. The person with the disability becomes a care-receiver, often struggling for independence and at risk of stigmatisation. Simultaneously, family and friends become informal caregivers, a demanding and usually unfamiliar role. Adaptation to these role changes is complex. Caregivers and care-receivers often work together to avoid stigma and compensate for the disability. However, each side experiences divergent practical, social and emotional demands which can also fracture the relationship, creating disagreements and misunderstandings.

Caregivers and care-receivers have been found to disagree about many things, including, care needs, risks and stress, and level of knowledge. it has also been found that caregivers rate care-receivers as more disabled than care-receivers rated themselves. Noble and Douglas found that family members wanted intensive interventions which were support focused, whereas care-receivers placed emphasis on interventions that fostered independence. Many disagreements centre on caregivers' identity, particularly their overprotectiveness, embarrassment, independence, and confidence

These disagreements and misunderstandings, it has been argued, stems in part from caregivers concealing the demands of care. Caregivers often conceal the demands of care in order to make the person receiving care feel more independent. But, this can result in the person receiving care feeling more independent than they are, and subsequently a range of misunderstandings. It has also been argued that caregivers concealing the burden of care may end up undermining their own identity, because they do not get the social recognition necessary to create a positive identity – their toil becomes invisible. This has been termed 'the caregiving bind,' namely, that caregivers concealing the demands of care to protect and support the identity of the care-receiver, may end up undermining their own caregiving identity.

=== Economics ===
The amount of caregiving which is done as unpaid work exceeds the amount done as work for hire. In the United States, for example, a 1997 study estimated the labor value of unpaid caregiving at US$196 billion, while the formal home health care work sector generated US$32 billion and nursing home care generated US$83 billion. The implication is that since so much personal investment is made in this sector, social programs to increase the efficiency and efficacy of caregivers would bring great benefit to society if they were easy to access and use.

== See also ==
- Caregiver
- Care work
- Long-term care
- Carer's rights
- Dementia caregiving
- Family Caregiver Alliance
- Ageing Without Children
