= Caregiver burden =

Stress experienced by caregivers

Caregiver burden, also called caregiver burnout, refers to the sum of physical, emotional, social, and financial difficulties experienced by unpaid caregivers due to providing care for a family member or a friend.

== Impact ==
=== Caregiver wellbeing ===
Caring for a loved one can have positive effects on the caregiver, for example, feelings of mutuality, personal growth, and increased family cohesion. However, providing long-term, unpaid care can also have wide-ranging negative effects on carers' physical and mental health and on their financial situation.

Caregiving responsibilities can limit informal caregivers' ability to engage in social activities, maintain relationships, and pursue personal interests. Many caregivers lack adequate support from family members, friends, healthcare providers, and community resources. Feeling unsupported or misunderstood can compound the challenges of caregiving and increase feelings of burden. Informal, unpaid caregivers frequently experience loneliness, social isolation, alienation, and difficulties reconciling their own needs with their role as caregiver. Many feel overwhelmed by caregiving responsibilities.

The financial cost of caring for a family member can be substantial, including expenses for medical care, medications, in-home care services, assisted living facilities, and other related costs. Caregivers are more likely to reduce their work hours or leave their jobs entirely to provide care, leading to loss of income and financial strain. They also face difficulties when trying to re-enter employment later on.

Because the caregiver burden may be felt strongly by one person and not at all by another, regardless of the caregiving situation, it is considered to be subjective and it may be called the "subjective burden". The subjective burden is considered to be one of the most important predictors of negative outcomes from the home care situation.

=== Cultural differences ===
The difficulties caused by caregiving might not always be understood as a burden. For example, family caregivers of people with dementia living in low- and middle-income countries might not look at the negative impacts of their care work through the concept of burden.

=== Caring styles and decisions ===
People who experience caregiver burden can display a wide range of behaviors towards the person in need of care, from loving devotion to abusive behavior (which can manifest as neglect and/or mistreatment). The most common form of abusive behavior is verbal aggression, mainly due to challenging behaviour of the person in need of care. People experiencing caregiver burden are more likely to display abusive behavior and other negative caring styles toward the individuals they care for than those who are not experiencing caregiver burden.

The caregiver burden often influences the caregiver's decision to eventually institutionalize. Caregiver burden is particularly associated with the care of people with dementia, meaning that the likelihood of institutionalization is especially heightened in those experiencing caregiver burden who care for people suffering from dementia.

== Risk factors ==
The burden is mainly associated with carer's characteristics and care provision, rather than chronic conditions of care recipients, except for dementia. For people with dementia, their behavioural problems or psychological symptoms are the main contributor to caregiver burden.

Several factors associated with carers contribute to the risk of caregiver burden, including gender, education level, living arrangements, mental health, social support, financial stability, caregiving intensity, and autonomy in assuming the caregiving role. Female caregivers are particularly vulnerable, as they are more likely to take on caregiving responsibilities and experience emotional distress. Lower levels of education may also increase susceptibility, as caregivers with limited knowledge and resources may struggle to navigate complex healthcare needs.

Residing with the care recipient has been identified as a significant risk factor, as it often leads to continuous exposure to the challenges of caregiving without respite. The emotional toll of 24/7 caregiving, especially in cases involving chronic illnesses such as dementia, cancer, or end-of-life care, can be particularly severe. Additionally, care transitions, such as moving a patient from hospital to home, often increase the caregiver's responsibilities and stress levels, further exacerbating caregiver burden.

== Measurement ==
There are a variety of methods to measures caregiver well-being, with caregiver burden being one of the most looked-at domains. The instruments includes the Zarit Burden Interview (ZBI), the Caregiver Strain Index and the Cost of Care Index, Burden Scale for Family Caregivers, Caregivers' Daily Issues.

ZBI is the most widely used instrument to measure caregiver burden. Initially created as a 29-item self-report questionnaire, it evaluates the challenges faced by informal caregivers, including physical, emotional, social, and financial strain, along with their relationship with the care recipient. It was later refined into a more concise 22-item version. The instrument has been translated and validated in a variety of languages, including Chinese, Italian, and Persian

== Support and interventions ==
There are various forms of support, services, and interventions that may improve the wellbeing of family caregivers and ease their burden. Some interventions can also be effective when delivered remotely.

=== Complementary formal care ===
Using ongoing formal care services to substitute some of the caregiving can ease the burden on family caregivers. These complementary formal services can include home care, day care, personal assistants, and programs like Meals on Wheels. Regularly used services of this kind can have a positive impact on carers' employment, enabling them to continue working alongside caregiving.

Another form of complementary formal care is respite care which is designed to provide short breaks and relief to caregivers through the temporary provision of substitute care. Even though many caregivers value respite care and express their satisfaction with it, the service does not seem to result in long-term improvements in emotional wellbeing. This contradiction might be explained by the respite care providing only occasional and temporary relief, after which carers return to the unchanged demands of long-term caregiving.

=== Training and education ===
Given the complex and wide-ranging needs of people with dementia, their carers require specific knowledge and skills to provide effective care. However, family caregivers often lack knowledge about the disease and its progression, and how to deliver care. Even when information is available, it is typically difficult to understand.

Education and training for family caregivers can cover the nature of dementia, caregiving techniques, communication skills, and stress-coping methods. Providing education and training for family caregivers can reduce some of their burden. However, these are more likely to be effective when caregivers are actively participating in the process instead of passively receiving information. Psychoeducation for informal carers is effective in reducing burden and anxiety, and in helping carers process grief.

As informal caregivers living in low- and middle-income countries might not look at dementia care through the concept of burden, providing knowledge about dementia caregiving can raise their awareness about this approach. In turn, this might encourage them to seek help and have positive effects on their mental health.

=== Psychological therapy and support groups ===
Receiving psychological therapies and attending support groups can also be effective in supporting the mental health of family caregivers. Cognitive behavioural therapy (CBT) can have positive effects on caregiver burden and grief. CBT, mindfulness-based cognitive therapy, behavioural activation, and acceptance and commitment therapy can be effective in treating depression in informal carers.

=== Multicomponent interventions ===
The different forms of services and interventions can also be combined into multicomponent interventions which often improve caregiver wellbeing more than their components separately.

An example of an effective multicomponent intervention for family caregivers of people with dementia is the START (STrAtegies for RelaTives) programme. START consists of 8 sessions delivered one-to-one by psychologists. The sessions using methods from cognitive behaviour therapy include education about dementia, psychoeducation of stress coping skills, and teaching relaxation. When tested in the United Kingdom, the START programme effectively reduced anxiety and depression in family caregivers.

== By country ==
=== United States ===
A nationwide survey showed that 32% and 19% of carers in the United States experience high and medium caregiver burden, respectively, while carers and their feeling are often neglected in clinical settings.

== History ==
Modern nursing and caregiving, which emerged in the 18th century, were largely centred on women's self-sacrificing service, with little documentation of the negative aspects of caregiving responsibilities. It was not until the 1950s that researchers began to focus on the hardships and suffering experienced by caregivers. Peter Townsend (1957), after interviewing working-class men and women in East London, England, found that 22% of his study participants experienced "a strain of illness" due to the transition from employment to caregiving.

In the 1960s, Grad and Sainsbury (1963) first defined the burden of caregiving as any cost to the family. This definition was later refined by Hoenig and Hamilton (1966) and Platt and Hirsch (1981) to distinguish between objective burden, which refers to specific activities and events related to negative caring experiences, and subjective burden, which relates to caregivers' personal emotions and experiences. Subjective burden encompasses the emotional strain caregivers endure, while objective burden includes tangible aspects of caregiving that contribute to negative experiences. Various terms to describe caregiver burden were also used, such as caretaker role fatigue, spousal burnout, and role engulfment.

== See also ==
- Dementia caregiving
- Family caregivers
- Care work
