= Feeding tube =

Medical device used to provide nutrition to people

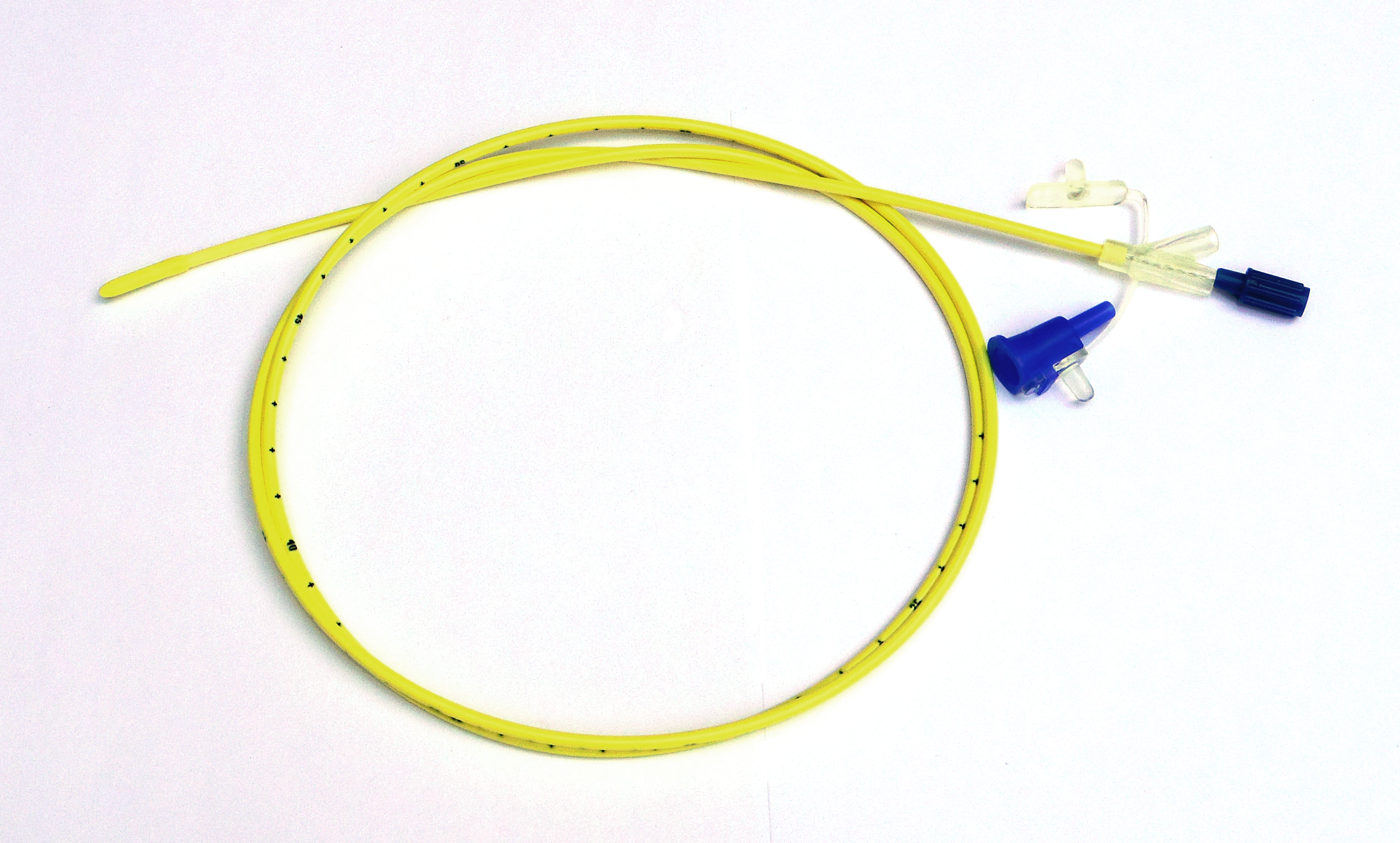
- ICD-9-CM: 96.35
- MeSH: D004750

A feeding tube, also known as an enteral tube, is a medical device used to provide nutrition, medications, or fluids to people who are unable to swallow safely, or need nutritional supplementation. The state of being fed by a feeding tube is called enteral (using the gastrointestinal tract) feeding or tube feeding. Placement may be temporary for the treatment of acute conditions or lifelong in the case of chronic disabilities.

A variety of feeding tubes are used in medical practice. They are usually made of polyurethane or silicone. The outer diameter of a feeding tube is measured in French units (each French unit equals 1/3 mm). They are classified by the site of insertion and intended use.

== Medical uses ==
There are more than a dozen of conditions that may require tube feeding (enteral nutrition) to prevent or treat malnutrition. Conditions that necessitate feeding tubes include prematurity, failure to thrive (or malnutrition), neurologic and neuromuscular disorders, inability to swallow, anatomical and post-surgical malformations of the mouth and esophagus, cancer, Sanfilippo syndrome, and digestive disorders.

=== Children ===
Feeding tubes are used widely in children with excellent success for a wide variety of conditions. Some children use them temporarily until they are able to eat on their own, while other children require them for a longer time. Some children only use feeding tubes to supplement their oral diet, while others rely on them exclusively.

=== Dementia ===
Tube feedings are not recommended for those with advanced dementia. People with advanced dementia who get feeding assistance rather than feeding tubes have better outcomes. Feeding tubes do not increase life expectancy for such people, or protect them from aspiration pneumonia. Feeding tubes can also increase the risk of pressure ulcers, require pharmacological or physical restraints, and lead to distress.

=== Intensive care unit ===
Feeding tubes are often used in the intensive care unit (ICU) to provide nutrition to people who are critically ill while their medical conditions are addressed. Those who are critically ill have decreased nutrient intake, reduced nutrient utilization and increased inflammation and metabolic needs. Malnutrition in critically ill people is associated with death, prolonged hospitalizations, and hospital readmissions. In critically ill people who have malnutrition or at risk of the disorder, individualized medical nutrition therapy (MNT) with a dietician is the preferred initial treatment. MNT involves a nutritional assessment, patient counselling to increase nutritional intake, oral nutritional supplements and if required; tube feeds or total parenteral nutrition (TPN). In critically ill patients, MNT (including tube feedings if needed) was associated with a lower risk of death, with a 27% lower risk of death up to 6 months after hospital discharge, lower risk of hospital readmission, increased weight, and increased protein and caloric intake. Tube feeding is preferred over TPN. High protein tube feedings in the ICU have found no benefits as compared to standard feeding, and in some cases was associated with harm. Early tube feeding (within 24 hours of hospital admission) may also not be beneficial.

As of 2016, there was no consensus as to whether nasogastric or gastric tubes led to better outcomes.

Studies assessing tube feedings outside of the critical care setting are lacking.

=== Mechanical obstruction and dysmotility ===
There is at least moderate evidence for feeding tubes improving outcomes for chronic malnutrition in people with cancers of the head and neck that obstruct the esophagus and would limit oral intake, people with advanced gastroparesis, and ALS. For long-term use, gastric tubes appear to have better outcomes than nasogastric tubes.

=== GI surgery ===
People who have surgery on their throat or stomach often have a feeding tube while recovering from surgery; a tube leading through the nose and down to the middle part of the small intestine is used, or a tube is directly placed through the abdomen to the small intestine. There is some evidence to suggest that people with a tube through the nose were able to start eating normally sooner and had shorter hospital stays.

== Product types ==
Medical nutrition companies make flavored products for drinking and unflavored for tube feeding. In the US, these are regulated as medical foods, which are defined in section 5(b) of the Orphan Drug Act (21 U.S.C. 360ee (b) (3)) as "a food which is formulated to be consumed or administered enterally under the supervision of a physician and which is intended for the specific dietary management of a disease or condition for which distinctive nutritional requirements, based on recognized scientific principles, are established by medical evaluation."

== Types ==
The most common types of tubes include those placed through the nose, including nasogastric, nasoduodenal, and nasojejunal tubes, and those placed directly into the abdomen, such as a gastrostomy, gastrojejunostomy, or jejunostomy feeding tube.

=== Nasogastric feeding tube ===
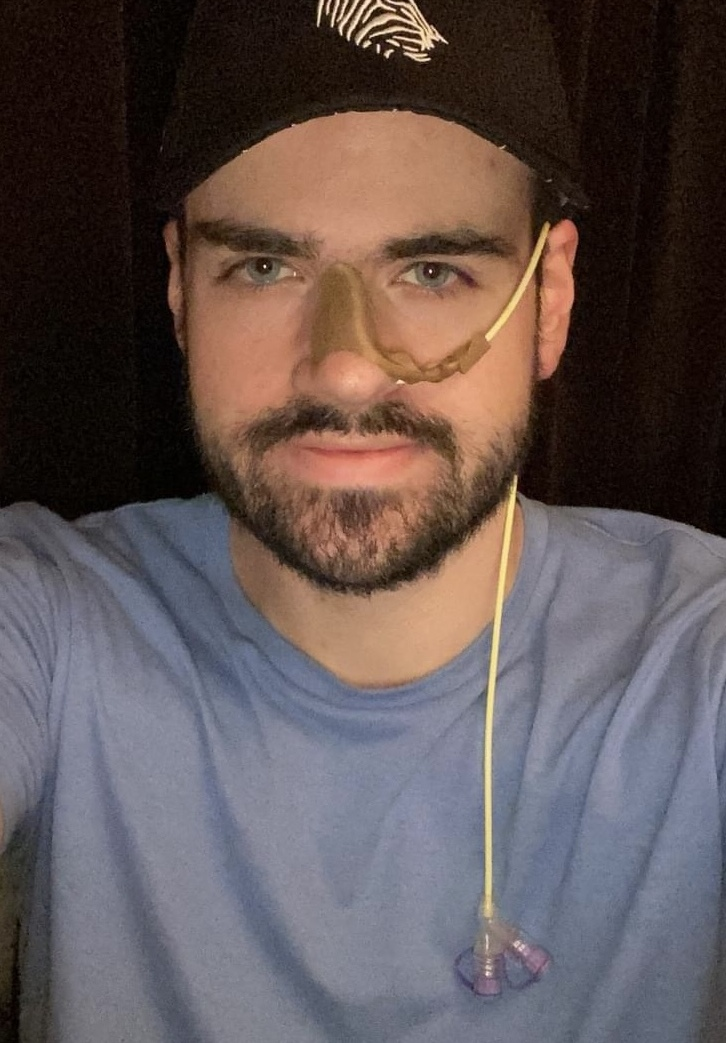
A man with a nasogastic tube which has a widely used ENFit connector fitted

A nasogastric feeding tube or NG-tube is passed through the nares (nostril), down the esophagus and into the stomach. This type of feeding tube is generally used for short term feeding, usually less than a month, though some infants and children may use an NG-tube long-term. Individuals who need tube feeding for a longer period of time are typically transitioned to a more permanent gastric feeding tube. The primary advantage of the NG-tube is that it is temporary and relatively non-invasive to place, meaning it can be removed or replaced at any time without surgery. NG-tubes can have complications, particularly related to accidental removal of the tube and nasal irritation. More specifically, when nasogastric or nasoenteric tubes are placed incorrectly, they can damage patients' vocal cords, lungs, or trachea, resulting in serious injuries or even death.

In March 2022, Avanos Medical's Cortrak2 EAS recall, for instance, has been classified as a Class I recall by the FDA, following reports of injuries and patient deaths caused by misplaced nasoenteric or nasogastric tubes.

=== Nasojejunal feeding tube ===
A nasojejunal or NJ-tube is similar to an NG-tube except that it is threaded through the stomach and into the jejunum, the middle section of the small intestine. In some cases, a nasoduodenal or ND-tube may be placed into the duodenum, the first part of the small intestine. These types of tube are used for individuals who are unable to tolerate feeding into the stomach, due to dysfunction of the stomach, impaired gastric motility, severe reflux or vomiting. These types of tubes must be placed in a hospital setting.

=== Gastrostomy or gastric feeding tube ===
A gastric feeding tube (G-tube or "button") is a tube inserted through a small incision in the abdomen into the stomach and is used for long-term enteral nutrition. One type is the percutaneous endoscopic gastrostomy (PEG) tube which is placed endoscopically. The position of the endoscope can be visualized on the outside of the person's abdomen because it contains a powerful light source. A needle is inserted through the abdomen, visualized within the stomach by the endoscope, and a suture passed through the needle is grasped by the endoscope and pulled up through the esophagus. The suture is then tied to the end of the PEG tube that will be external, and pulled back down through the esophagus, stomach, and out through the abdominal wall. The insertion takes about 20 minutes. The tube is kept within the stomach either by a balloon on its tip (which can be deflated) or by a retention dome which is wider than the tract of the tube. G-tubes may also be placed surgically, using either an open or laparoscopic technique.

Gastric feeding tubes are suitable for long-term use, though they sometimes need to be replaced if used long-term. The G-tube can be useful where there is difficulty with swallowing because of neurologic or anatomic disorders (stroke, esophageal atresia, tracheoesophageal fistula, radiotherapy for head and neck cancer, etc.), and to decrease the risk of aspiration pneumonia. However, in people with advanced dementia or adult failure to thrive, it does not decrease the risk of pneumonia. There is moderate quality evidence suggesting that the risk of aspiration pneumonia may be reduced by inserting the feeding tube into the duodenum or the jejunum (post-pyloric feeding), when compared to inserting the feeding tube into the stomach. People with dementia may attempt to remove the PEG, which causes complications.

==== Gastric drainage tube ====
A G-tube may instead be used for gastric drainage as a longer-term solution to the condition where blockage in the proximal small intestine causes bile and acid to accumulate in the stomach, typically leading to periodic vomiting, or if the vagus nerve is damaged. Where such conditions are only short term, as in a hospital setting, a nasal tube connected to suction is usually used. A blockage lower in the intestinal tract may be addressed with a surgical procedure known as a colostomy, and either type of blockage may be corrected with a bowel resection under appropriate circumstances. If such correction is not possible or practical, nutrition may be supplied by parenteral nutrition.

=== Gastrojejunal feeding tube ===
A gastrojejunal tube (GJ-tube, gastrojejunostomy tube) is a combination device that includes access to both the stomach and the jejunum, or middle part of the small intestine. Typical tubes are placed in a G-tube site or stoma, with a narrower long tube continuing through the stomach and into the small intestine. The GJ-tube is used widely in individuals with severely impaired gastric motility, high risk of aspiration, or an inability to feed into the stomach. It allows the stomach to be continually vented or drained while simultaneously feeding into the small intestine. GJ-tubes are typically placed by an interventional radiologist in a hospital setting (a gastrojejunostomy). The primary complication of a GJ-tube is migration of the long portion of the tube out of the intestine and back into the stomach.

=== Jejunal feeding tube ===
A jejunostomy feeding tube (J-tube) is a tube surgically or endoscopically inserted through the abdomen and into the jejunum (the second part of the small intestine).

== Complications ==
Nasogastric and nasojejunal tubes are meant to convey liquid food to the stomach or intestines. When inserted incorrectly, the tip may rest in the respiratory system instead of the stomach or intestines; in this case, the liquid food will enter the lungs, resulting in pneumonia and can, in rare cases, lead to death.

Complications associated with gastrostomy tubes (inserted through the abdomen and into the stomach or intestines) include leakage of gastric contents (containing hydrochloric acid) around the tube into the abdominal (peritoneal) cavity resulting in peritonitis, a serious complication which will cause death if it is not properly treated. Septic shock is another possible complication. Minor leakage may cause irritation of the skin around the gastrostomy site or stoma. Barrier creams, to protect the skin from the corrosive acid, are used to manage this.

A phenomenon called "tube dependency" has been discussed in the medical literature, in which a child refuses to eat after being on a feeding tube, but it is not recognized as a disorder in the ICD or DSM, and its epidemiology is unknown. The Graz tube weaning model attempts to minimise or avoid this problem.

== Oral and dental complications ==
Guidelines for dental care for children fed by tube are poorly established. Many dental complications arise due to poor oral health that may result from reluctance or intolerance towards oral hygiene practices by patients and caregivers, abundance of dental plaque or tooth decay, and lack of oral stimulation. Although many studies on this topic involve a relatively small sample size, the findings are important as they are associated with the development of various oral conditions, dental diseases and even systemic diseases such as aspiration pneumonia.

=== Calculus ===
Adults fed by tube have previously shown a significantly higher rate and quantity of calculus deposition than adults fed orally. Even with an intensive oral hygiene program in place, adults fed by tube still demonstrate a greater quantity of supra-gingival calculus accumulation, which can be a risk factor for several oral diseases including periodontal diseases and aspiration pneumonia. Although calculus removal may be difficult for caregivers to perform and provide an unpleasant experience for patients with a feeding tube, the implications of calculus in the initiation of aspiration pneumonia make it clear that it poses a serious health risk. Research suggests that the best course of treatment for patients with a gastric tube is periodic professional cleaning, maintained with routine home use of a non-foaming anti-calculus dentifrice (toothpaste).

=== Caries ===
Dental caries is a localized disease in which susceptible tooth structure is broken down by bacteria that are able to ferment carbohydrates into acid. Although it has not been extensively studied, researchers speculate that individuals fed by tube may be less prone to the development of caries as they are not exposed to carbohydrates orally. Examination of dental plaque from tube-fed individuals found that it contained fewer caries-associated microorganisms (lactobacilli and streptococcus) and had reduced ability to produce acids, suggesting an overall weaker ability to cause caries. Further, studies with animal subjects found that tube-feeding was not associated with tooth decay, even when combined with reduced salivation. Thus, tube-feeding alone does not necessarily directly promote the development of caries.

=== Periodontal diseases ===
To date, no published studies have been conducted on periodontal disease indicators (including clinical attachment loss, pocket depth, or periodontal indices) among tube-fed individuals. However, since tube feeding is correlated with calculus build-up, which is known to be a risk factor in the development of periodontal diseases, further investigation is critical to determine what role tube feeding might have in the development of periodontal disease.

=== Dental erosion ===
Dental erosion is the dissolution of the tooth's hard structures (enamel, dentin & cementum) by exposure to acids not caused by bacteria. In the case of individuals fed by gastric tube, acid may enter the oral cavity through reflux of gastric contents. Gastroesophageal reflux disease (GERD) affects up to 67% of children and young adults with central nervous system dysfunction, a condition which in itself is normally an indicator for tube feeding. The effects of gastric acid on the teeth may sometimes be masked or minimized by the abundance of calculus. Tube feeding may either resolve, exacerbate or introduce the issue of GERD in individuals.

=== Aspiration pneumonia ===
Individuals fed by tube are susceptible to aspiration through a multitude of factors. Firstly, undisturbed plaque is known to shift towards the type of bacteria (Gram-negative anaerobic) implicated in aspiration pneumonia. Additionally, tube-fed patients are commonly affected by gastroesophageal reflux and a breakdown in the airway protection reflex (breathing while swallowing). This results in the inadvertent inhalation of bacteria-containing gastric juices as they are re-swallowed, leading to the development of aspiration pneumonia.

Post-pyloric feeding, in which the tip of the feeding tube extends past the pyloric sphincter of the lower stomach, is associated with lower risks of aspiration into the lungs, aspiration pneumonia, or gastroesophageal reflux. It is also associated with a quicker time to meet nutritional goals.

=== Oral hypersensitivity ===
While a child undergoes a period of tube-feeding, there is a lack of oral stimulation that can lead to the development of oral hypersensitivity. This can complicate the delivery of dental care and serve as a barrier for the child's return to oral feeding. This can also lead to dysphagia (difficulty swallowing), muscle weakness and improper airway protection, resulting in longer periods of tube-feeding and increased risk of dental complications. A dentist may prescribe a "desensitization program", which involves routine stimulation of intra-oral and extra-oral structures, and encourage oral hygiene procedures to be performed at home.

== History ==
While enemas were previously used for supplemental enteral nutrition, the practice of surgically inserting feeding tubes emerged in the mid to late 1800s. Initially, these procedures were largely unsuccessful, but they quickly improved with advancements in technique.

Originally, the nasogastric tube (NGT) was described by John Hunter in the 18th century as a combination of eelskin and whalebone. It was initially utilized to provide liquid nutrition to the ill.

== See also ==
- Bioethics
- Force-feeding (for tube feeding against an individual's will or as torture)
- Intralipid
- Medical food
- Nutrient enema
