= Respite care =

Temporary care for caregivers

In the field of healthcare, respite care is either planned care or temporary emergency healthcare that is provided to the caregiver(s) of a child patient or adult patient. In order to support and maintain the social health of the primary relationship between the patient and the caregiver, respite care programs offer planned, short-term rest breaks and limited-time rest breaks for the families and the other unpaid caregivers of children and adult patients who are either disabled or have a cognitive loss. Respite can also provide a positive experience for the patient who is receiving healthcare services.

Although a family may willingly provide healthcare to their relatives, in the long term, there may be physical, emotional, and financial consequences for the caregiver, who can become overwhelmed without some support. Programs of respite care provide a rest break for the family caregiver, which benefits the physical and the mental health of the caregiver. A 2005 survey by the Commonwealth Fund indicated that among adults aged 19 to 64 years in the United States, sixty percent of family caregivers compared to thirty-three percent of non caregivers reported health problems consisting of: fair or poor personal health, one or more chronic illnesses, or a disability or handicap.

Respite care sustains the health and wellness of the person who is the family caregiver; it helps avoid or delay taking the patient out of their home, and reduces the risk of patient neglect and the abuse. An outcome-based evaluation pilot study showed that respite care also decreases the likelihood of a stress-induced divorce.

Respite care or respite services are also a family support service. In the US is a long-term services and support (LTSS) as described by the Consortium of Citizens with Disabilities in Washington, D.C. as of 2013.

There are many organisations in the UK and worldwide that help and support with respite care. In England, they are regulated by the Care Quality Commission (CQC).

== Models for respite care ==
There are various models for providing respite care.

=== In-home respite ===
In-home care is popular for obvious reasons. The temporary caregiver comes to the patient's home and gets to know the patient in their normal environment. The temporary caregiver learns the family routine, where medicines are stored, and ensures that the patient is not inconvenienced by transportation and strange environments. This model may involve friends, relatives and paid professionals. In the US, depending on the state, Medicaid or Medicare may be used to help cover the costs.

Respite (In-Home) Services means intermittent or regularly scheduled temporary non-medical care (which can be healthcare financed) or in-home supervision. In-home respite support typically includes:

- Assisting the family members to enable a person with developmental disabilities to stay home
- Providing appropriate care and supervision to ensure person's safety in the absence of a family member
- Relieving family members from the constantly demanding responsibility of providing care
- Attending to basic self-help needs and other activities that would ordinarily be performed by a family member—such as meal preparation, daily hygiene, and medication support—are common components of respite care.

=== Respite (out-of-home) services ===
Respite services are provided in the community at diverse sites and by service providers that operate licensed residential facilities or bill under a category called respite.

Respite services are typically obtained from a respite vendor using vouchers or alternative respite options. Vouchers allow families to choose their own service provider directly through a payment, coupon, or other form of authorization.

=== Respite and community ===
Respite care originated as a service in the 1950s, when parents sought government funding to pay for specialized childcare—referred to as respite—which was often provided by parent organizations themselves. Professional models of respite emerged in the 1970s, offering community-based recreational options for adults (e.g., at YMCAs, neighborhood centers, and organized runs and walks), giving parents a temporary break—or respite—from caregiving (Racino, 2000). As of the mid-2000s, New York State had over 950 service providers dedicated to intellectual disabilities (Castellani, 2005).

=== Group homes and respite ===
Many parents wanted a designated facility where they could drop off their child for respite care (e.g., on weekends). During the institutional era, this was a role state governments fulfilled before the recognition of children’s individual rights. States did fund and develop community-based respite centers (often small homes) and also allocated spaces in group homes for respite care. These efforts included innovative collaborations with friends of the home and partnerships within the private, non-profit sector.

=== Specialized facility ===
Another model utilizes a specialized local facility where care recipients can stay for periods ranging from a few days to several weeks. This approach offers the advantage of providing better access to emergency services and professional assistance when needed.

=== Emergency respite ===
Respite care may sometimes be needed on an emergency basis. With planned emergency care, caregivers proactively identify and arrange for a specific provider or facility to contact when emergencies arise. Numerous service options exist for emergency respite care, including home care agencies, adult day care centers, health centers, and residential care facilities.

=== Sitter-companion services ===
Sitter-companion services are one of about 6 different community approaches or models to respite care which were developed internationally. They all are paid services in the US, which are only available to designated "clients" of the service systems.

They are sometimes provided by local civic groups, the faith community and other community organizations. A regular sitter-companion can provide respite care for a few hours, once or twice a week.

=== Therapeutic adult daycare ===
Therapeutic adult day care programs typically provide respite care during standard business hours, five days a week. In some cases, these services may extend to 24-hour care. These facilities generally serve specific, designated client populations and are not directly connected to broader family support services—except when specialized care is itself considered a form of family support for those who seek it.

== Respite care charities in the UK ==
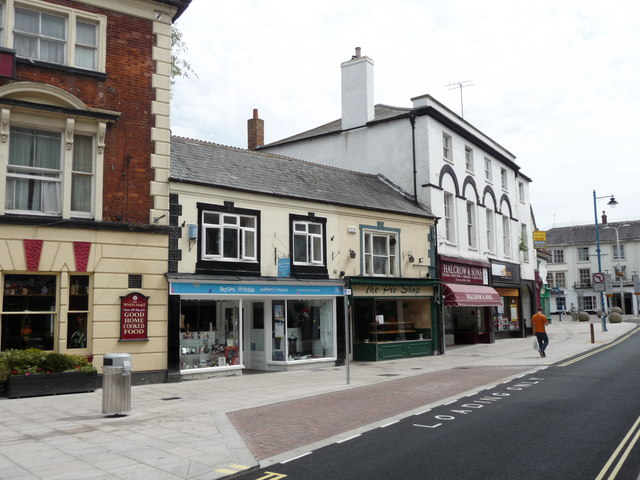
One Andover Charity Shop raises funds for hospice and respite care.

The Respite Association offers short-term funding support for qualified respite care services. This assistance enables carers of disabled, chronically ill, elderly, or terminally ill individuals to take necessary breaks. Several other organizations share this mission, including Revitalise and Care for Carers. Additionally, condition-specific charities like the Alzheimer's Association provide specialized respite support.

== See also ==
- Caregiver burden
- Caregiver stress
- Respite care in the United States
