= Jejunostomy =

Surgical opening of the skin

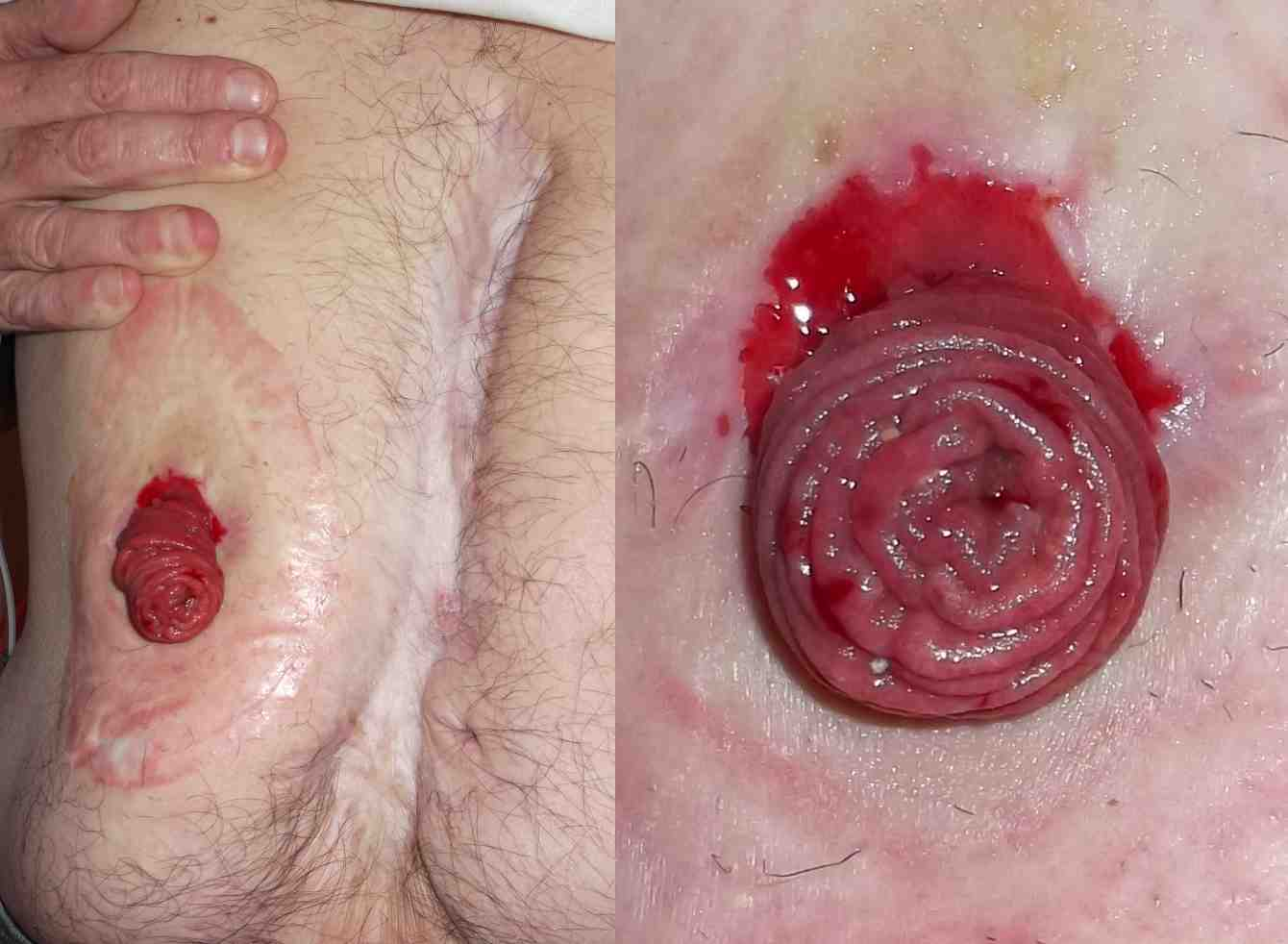
- Jejunostomy to the abdomen wall
- ICD-9-CM: 46.32
- MeSH: D007582

Jejunostomy is the surgical creation of an opening (stoma) through the skin at the front of the abdomen and the wall of the jejunum (part of the small intestine). It can be performed either endoscopically, or with open surgery.

A jejunostomy may be formed following bowel resection in cases where there is a need to bypass the distal small bowel and/or colon due to a bowel leak or perforation. Depending on the length of jejunum resected or bypassed the patient may have resultant short bowel syndrome and require parenteral nutrition.

A jejunostomy is different from a jejunal feeding tube. A jejunal feeding tube is an alternative to a gastrostomy feeding tube and is commonly used when gastric enteral feeding is contraindicated or carries significant risks. The advantage over a gastrostomy is its low risk of aspiration due to its distal placement. Disadvantages include small bowel obstruction, ischemia, and requirement for continuous feeding.

== Techniques ==
The Witzel jejunostomy is the most common method of jejunostomy creation. It is an open technique where the jejunosotomy is sited 30 cm distal to the Ligament of Treitz on the antimesenteric border, with the catheter tunneled in a seromuscular groove.
