= Caregiver =

Person helping another with activities of daily living

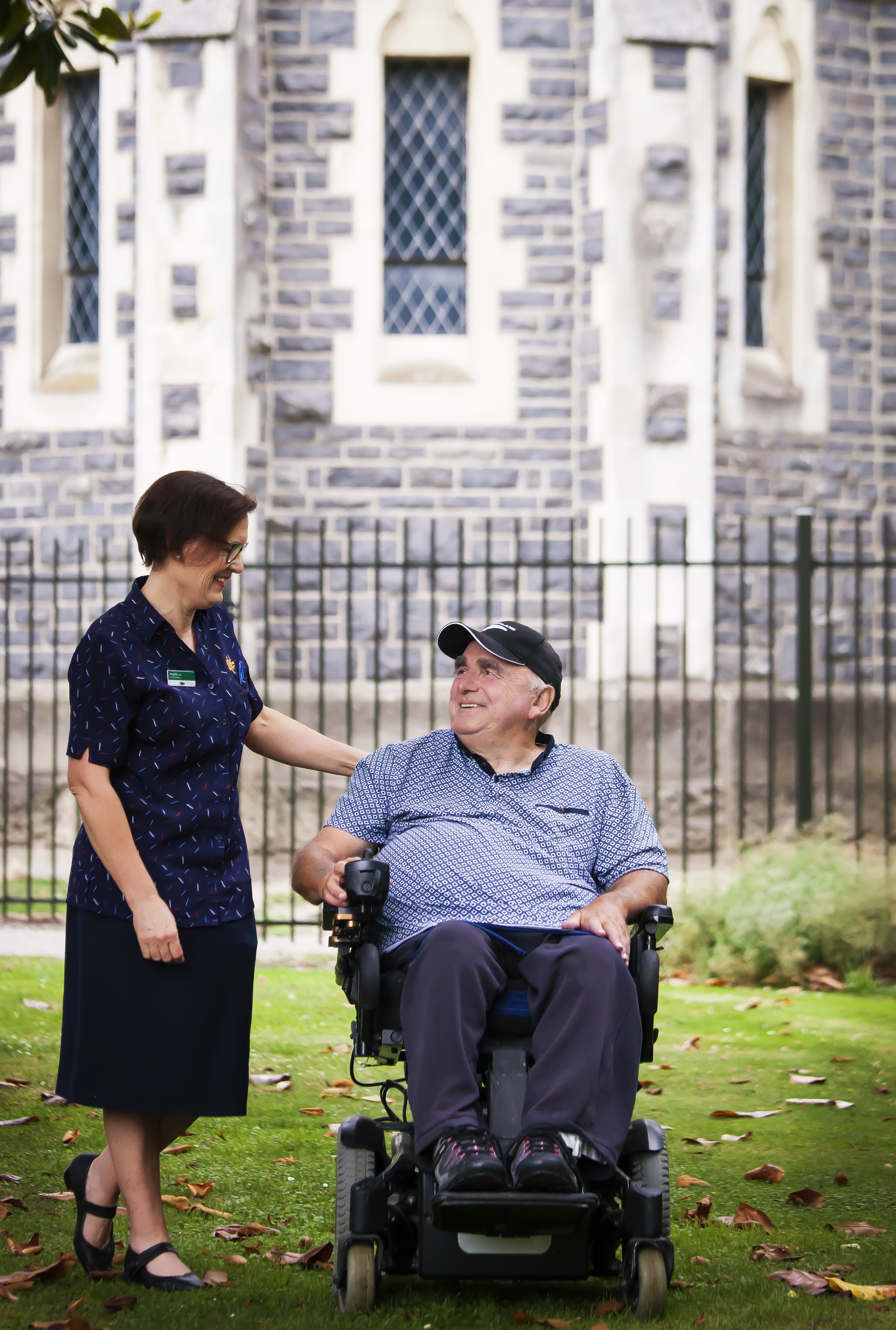
A resident of St John of God Trust and a caregiver in Halswell, New Zealand

A caregiver, caretaker or direct care worker is a person who provides physical, emotional or personal care for people who can not function independently due to age, chronic illness, injury or disability. A caregiver can be either formal or informal. Formal caregivers (also known as paid caregivers) are trained professionals, including direct care workers (DCW) at hospitals, day-care centers and nursing homes; home care and respite care providers; healthcare assistants; and other unlicensed assistive personnel. Family caregivers (also known as informal or unpaid caregivers) are relatives, neighbors or friends who provide this support.

Typical duties of a caregiver include activities of daily living (ADLs) and instrumental activities of daily living (IADLs). ADLs are the primary self-care tasks people must do everyday for basic physical needs and personal care. Examples of ADLs include bathing or showering, dressing, eating, toileting and mobility. Where as IADLs are more complex tasks required to live independently in the community. Examples of IADLs include managing medications, preparing meals, shopping, managing finances, performing household chores, preparing meals and scheduling appointments. Doctors use functional assessments, that scores ones ability to perform these activities, which can help determine ones level of impairment and specific needs for support.

== Overview ==
A primary caregiver is the person who takes primary responsibility for someone who cannot fully care for themselves. The primary caregiver may be a family member, a trained professional, or another individual. The concept of the primary caregiver can be important in attachment theory as well as in family law, for example in guardianship and child custody.

A person may need care due to loss of health, loss of memory, the onset of illness, an incident or risk of falling, anxiety, depression, grief, or a disabling condition.

== Technique ==
=== Basic principles ===
Caregiving requires effective communication with the person receiving care, including not only giving instructions but also actively listening, showing empathy, and ensuring the patient's health needs are understood. Care is given with respect for the dignity and values of the person receiving care.

The caregiver remains in contact with the patient's primary healthcare provider, often a doctor or nurse. They also help the person receiving care make decisions about their treatment, daily life, and healthcare plans while supporting them throughout the process. Caregivers often provide emotional support and comfort to their patients to help them maintain psychological well-being.

In addition to communication, the caregiver is responsible for managing their own hygiene, that of the patient, and their living environment. Surfaces in the living area are regularly cleaned and wiped, and laundry is managed to ensure a healthy living environment. Caregivers may also help with household tasks such as cleaning and meal preparation to support daily living needs.

Additionally, the caregiver helps organize the patient's daily agenda, including medical appointments, medication schedules, and daily living tasks. This includes coordinating healthcare visits and ensuring medications are taken as prescribed. In addition, the caregiver maintains access to healthcare products for the patient.

=== Monitoring ===
The caregiver remains in close contact with the person receiving care and monitors their health.

Some people receiving care require someone to monitor their breathing or body temperature. It is expected that a caregiver would notice changes in breathing and should be able to follow the doctor's instructions in monitoring the person. Some patients may also need blood pressure monitoring, blood glucose monitoring, or other specific health monitoring. In these cases, a doctor will advise the caregiver on how to use a thermometer or other tools required. Caregivers watch for changes in a person's mental condition, including becoming unhappy, withdrawn, less interested, confused, or otherwise not as healthy as they have been. In all monitoring, the caregiver takes notes of anything unusual and shares it with the doctor.

=== Keeping the person mentally alert ===
Mental health and physical health are linked, and mind–body interventions may increase physical health by improving mental health. These practices seek to improve a person's quality of life by helping them socialize with others, keep friendships, do hobbies, and enjoy whatever physical exercise is appropriate. In many cases, these activities are performed or helped in by caregivers.

Caregivers encourage people to leave their homes for the health benefits of the resulting physical and mental activity. This is supported by evidence that shows social connection and social support help improve one's mental health and increase the benefits of physical activity. Also, the interaction and sense of belonging during an activity helps their psychological wellbeing. Depending on a person's situation, a walk through their own neighborhood or a visit to a park may require planning or have risks, but it is done when possible.

=== Eating assistance ===
Caregivers help people have a healthy diet. This help might include giving nutrition suggestions based on the recommendations of dietitians, monitoring body weight, addressing difficulty swallowing or eating, complying with dietary restrictions, assisting with the use of any dietary supplements, and arranging for pleasant mealtimes. A healthy diet includes everything to meet a person's food energy and nutritional needs. A poor diet contributes to many health problems, including increased risk of infection, poor recovery time from surgery or wound healing, skin problems, difficulty in activities of daily living, fatigue, and irritability. Older people are less likely to recognize thirst and may benefit from being offered water.

Difficulty eating is most often caused by difficulty swallowing. This symptom is common in people after a stroke, people with Parkinson's disease or who have multiple sclerosis, and people with dementia. The most common way that caregivers people with trouble swallowing is to change the texture of their food to be softer. Another way is to use special eating equipment to make it easier for the person to eat. In some situations, caregivers can be supportive by providing assisted feeding in which the person's independence is respected while the caregiver helps them take food in their mouth by placing it there and being patient with them.

=== Support with managing medications ===
Caregivers have a vital role in supporting people with managing their medications at home. A person living with chronic illness may have a complex medication regimen with multiple medications and doses at different times of the day. Caregivers may assist in managing medications in many ways. This may range from going to the pharmacy to collect medications, helping with devices such as a Webster-pak or a dosette box, or actually administering the medications at home. These medications might include tablets, but also creams, injections or liquid medications.

== Complications ==
=== Discontinuing unnecessary treatment ===
For some diseases, such as advanced cancer, there may be no treatment of the disease which can prolong the life of the patient or improve the patient's quality of life. In such cases, standard medical advice would be for the caregiver and patient to have conversations with the doctor about the risks and benefits of treatment and to seek options for palliative care or hospice.

During end-of-life care, the caregiver can assist in discussions about screening which is no longer necessary. Screenings which would be indicated at other times of life, like colonoscopy, breast cancer screening, prostate cancer screening, bone density screening, and other tests, may not be reasonable to have for a person at the end of life who would not take treatment for these conditions and who would only be disturbed to learn they had them. It can be the caregiver's place to have conversations about the potential benefits for screenings and to participate in discussions about their usefulness. An example of a need for caregiver intervention is to talk with people on dialysis who cannot have cancer treatment and can have no benefit from cancer screening, but who consider getting the screening.

People with diabetes who use caregiving services, like those in a nursing home, frequently have problems using sliding-scale insulin therapy, which is the use of varying amounts of insulin depending on the person's blood sugar. For people receiving caregiving services, long-acting insulin doses are indicated with varying doses of insulin being the less preferred treatment.

Advance care planning should note if a patient is using an implantable cardioverter-defibrillator (ICD) and give instructions about the circumstances in which leaving it activated would be contrary to the patient's goals. An ICD is a device designed to prevent cardiac arrhythmia in heart patients. This is a life-saving device for increasing one's lifespan, but at the end of life, the caregiver may discuss deactivating this device with the patient and healthcare provider. For patients at the end of life, the device rarely prevents death as intended; using the device at the end of life can cause pain to the patient and distress to others seeing the patient's experience.

=== Behavior changes ===
Caregivers are recommended to help people find alternatives to using sleep medication when possible. Caregivers can help people improve their sleep hygiene in other ways, such as getting regular exercise, keeping to a sleep schedule, and arranging for a quiet place to sleep.

Caregivers are recommended to help people find alternatives to using appetite stimulants or food supplements high in food energy. These treatments are not proven to provide benefit over alternatives but they do increase the risk of various health problems. One alternative to using appetite stimulants is to provide social support, as many people are more comfortable eating when sharing a meal with others. People who have trouble eating may appreciate assisted feeding from their caregiver. Depending on the situation, a caregiver, patient, and physician may decide to forgo any dietary restrictions such as a low sodium diet and feed the person what they enjoy eating despite the health consequences if that seems preferable and more beneficial over using appetite stimulants.

== Caregiver wellbeing ==
=== Informal caregivers ===
In the case of family caregivers, caring for a loved one can have positive effects on the caregiver, for example, feelings of mutuality, personal growth, and increased family cohesion. However, providing long-term, unpaid care for someone can also have wide-ranging negative effects on carers' physical and mental health and on their financial situation. The sum of physical, emotional, social, and financial challenges experienced by caregivers is referred to as caregiver burden. Formal caregivers such as nursing staff at long-term care facilities are at increased risk of stress and burnout.

There are various forms of support, services, and interventions that may improve the wellbeing of family caregivers. Effective measures include complementary formal services, training and psychoeducation, psychological therapies such as cognitive behavioural therapy, and support groups.

== Society and culture ==
=== Caregiving certification ===
Some agencies, such as nursing homes and assisted living communities, require caregiver certification as a condition for employment. Most US states have caregiver resource centers that can assist in locating a reputable training class. In many cases, training is available at local colleges, vocational schools, organizations such as the American Red Cross, and at local and national caregiver organizations. National organizations include the National Association for Home Care and Hospice, the Family Caregiver Alliance and the National Family Caregivers Association.

=== Elder abuse ===
Caregivers may sometimes be a part of elder abuse. It can include physical, emotional and financial abuse, domestic violence and neglect.

== See also ==
- Family caregivers
- Young carer
- Dignity of risk
- Outline of relationships
- Toileting
