= Assisted feeding =

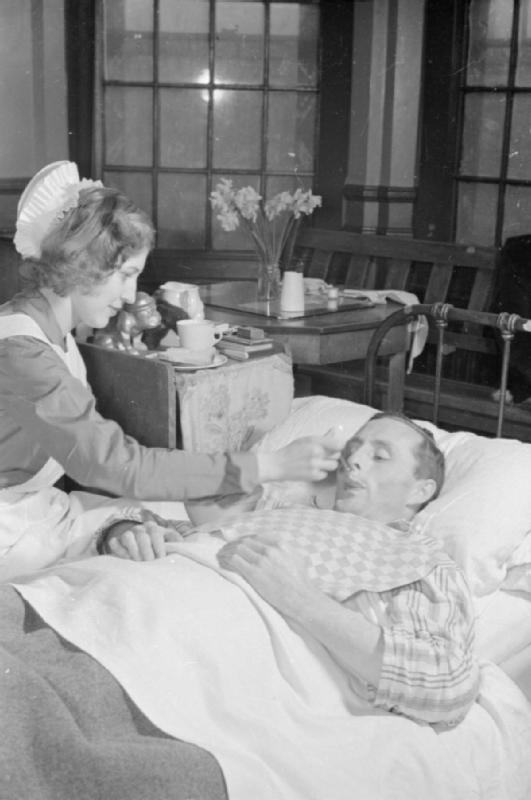
A nurse assisting a patient. 1941

Assisted feeding, also called hand feeding or oral feeding, is the action of a person feeding another person who cannot otherwise feed themselves. The term is used in the context of some medical issue or in response to a disability, such as when a person living with dementia is no longer able to manage eating alone. The person being fed must be able to eat by mouth, but lacks either the cognitive or physical ability to self-feed. Individuals who are born with a disability like cerebral palsy, or arthrogryposis multiplex congenita (AMC) may be unable to feed themselves. Also, those who acquire a disability due to an accident or a disease like amyotrophic lateral sclerosis (ALS) may require hand feeding because they may become unable to pick-up and bring food to their own mouth.

== Assisted feeding as an alternative to tube feeding ==
A feeding tube is a medical device used to provide nutrition to patients who cannot obtain nutrition by mouth, are unable to swallow safely, or need nutritional supplementation. Patients who are able to use assisted feeding should have that in preference to tube feeding whenever possible.

Oral assisted feedings are preferable to percutaneous feeding in individuals with advanced dementia.

== Monetary costs ==
In the United States a study reviewed a set of patients and found that the expenses to arrange assisted feeding for patients was higher than the cost of using a feeding tube.
