= Jeejeebhoy =

Jeejeebhoy is a surname. Notable people with the surname include:

- Avabai Jamsetjee Jeejeebhoy (born c.1793), wife of Jamsetjee Jeejeebhoy
- Byramjee Jeejeebhoy (c. 1822–1890), Indian businessman
- Khursheed Jeejeebhoy (born August 26, 1935) was a gastroenterologist
- Jeejeebhoy Piroshaw Bomanjee Jeejeebhoy (1891–1950), Indian military pilot
- Phiroze Jamshedji Jeejeebhoy, Indian businessman
- Rusi Jeejeebhoy (born 1942), Indian cricketer
