= Khurshid (disambiguation) =

Khurshid or Khursheed is a given name of Persian origin.

It may also refer to:

- Khursheed Bano (1914–2001), Indian actress and singer
- Khursheed Jeejeebhoy (born 1935), Indian physician
- Salman Khurshid (born 1952/53), Indian politician and diplomat
- Rustom Khurshedji Karanjia (1912–2008), Indian journalist and editor

== See also ==
- Khursheed Jah Devdi, palace in Hyderabad, India
