= Khursheed Jeejeebhoy =

Canadian gastroenterologist (born 1935)

Professor Khursheed Nowrojee Jeejeebhoy FRCPC
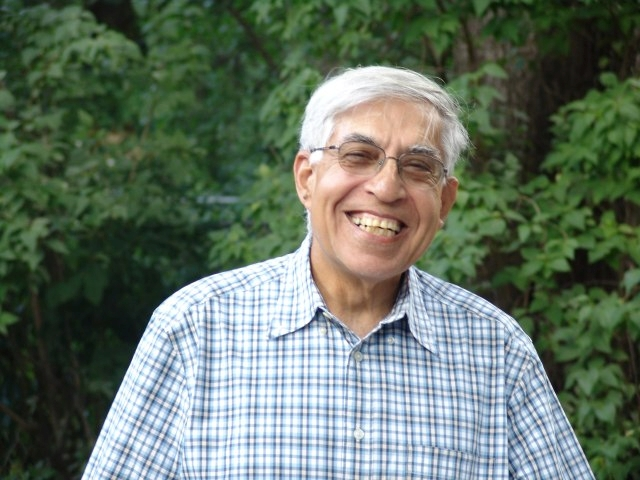
- Dr. Khursheed Nowrojee Jeejeebhoy at his 70th birthday party. Photograph by Shireen Anne Jeejeebhoy.
- Born: Khursheed Nowrojee Jeejeebhoy; 26 August 1935 (age 91); Rangoon, British Burma
- Citizenship: Canadian
- Education: University of Madras (MBBS) Royal Postgraduate Medical School, London University (Ph.D.)
- Known for: Gastroenterology, Nutrition,Total Parenteral Nutrition, Home Parenteral and Enteral Nutrition
- Children: Three
- Scientific career
- Fields: Medicine
- Workplaces: University of Toronto; University Health Network; St. Michael's Hospital
- Doctoral advisor: Dr. Nelson F. Coghill

Khursheed Nowrojee Jeejeebhoy (Gujarati: ખુરશીદ નવરોજી જીજીભાઈ; born August 26, 1935) is an internationally renowned gastroenterologist at the Toronto General Hospital, St. Michael's Hospital, Unity Health Toronto and professor of medicine, nutrition and physiology at the University of Toronto, best known for his pioneering work in the development of parenteral nutrition. He supervised 24 medical graduates from around the world and 13 M.Sc. and Ph.D. candidates who completed their degrees.

== Early life and education ==
Jeejeebhoy was born to an Indian Parsi family in Rangoon, Burma on August 26, 1935, Nowrojee Jeejeebhoy and Gulbanoo Nowrojee (Tarapore) Jeejeebhoy. The family was evacuated to India by air in a DC-3 ahead of advancing Japanese forces during the Japanese invasion of Burma. His father joined the Indian Army, and his maternal grandfather Pheroze Khurshetjee Tarapore was recalled to service after he had retired as an officer in the Indian Medical Service.

Due to World War II and his family's flight to India as refugees, Jeejeebhoy's schooling was initially very checkered. After his family fled to India, they lived a nomadic life and whether or not he attended school depended on where his father was stationed.

=== Education ===
Jeejeebhoy's maternal grandmother Rattan Tarapore, a medical doctor trained at JJ Hospital Medical School in Bombay, home schooled him. At age 15 he entered Nirmala College in Delhi and studied economics and political science. At age 17, upon hearing of the excellence of Christian Medical College Vellore he applied for one of the ten spots available to students not sponsored by a Christian Mission. Entrance was by competitive written exam and interview. He was the first one called to fill one of the ten spots. He placed First Class at the Examination at the University of Madras, Faculty of Medicine, with Bachelor of Medicine and Surgery, in December 1957 and obtained distinction in obstetrics and gynecology. He then gained practical experience for a year as an intern in order to qualify for his degree. He convocated with an MB,BS in February 1959, capturing nine of ten gold medals. The tenth medal was reserved for women.

From January to June 1959, he was House Physician at Christian Medical College Hospital in Vellore, India then House Surgeon from August 1959 to January 1960 at Christian Medical College, Ludhiana, India.

=== Practice and Ph.D., London, UK ===
From January to June 1959, he was House Physician at Christian Medical College Hospital in Vellore, India then House Surgeon from August 1959 to January 1960 at Christian Medical College, Ludhiana, India.

He moved to London, UK to start a 6-month appointment at West Middlesex University Hospital in London, UK, under Dr. Nelson F. Coghill. At the end of the six months, Coghill assisted Jeejeebhoy to get a research position at the Registrar level (equivalent to a senior resident in Canada) with Chris Booth at Hammersmith Hospital at the Royal Postgraduate Medical School, London University. During this tenure, Jeejeebhoy obtained his Ph.D. from London University, thesis entitled “Albumin metabolism in gastrointestinal disease” which was recommended for publication in an abridged form.

Jeejeebhoy was House Physician at West Middlesex Hospital, London, UK from February to October 1960; Research Registrar West Middlesex Hospital and Postgraduate Medical School of London (joint appointment); from January 1961 to January 1963, Tutor in Gastroenterology, The Postgraduate Medical School of London, concurrent with his appointment as Research Registrar.

Jeejeebhoy's first paper was published in Gut, co-authored with Coghill, in 1961.

Jeejeebhoy sat the exams for the Royal College of London and Royal College of Edinburgh to become a member of both colleges, a prerequisite to becoming a Consultant.

- Aug. 1959-Jan. 1960: House Surgeon, Christian Medical College Hospital, Ludhiana, India.
- Feb.-Oct. 1960: House Physician, West Middlesex Hospital, London, United Kingdom.
- Jan. 1961-Jan. 1963: Research Registrar, West Middlesex Hospital and Postgraduate Medical School of London (joint appointment).
- Jan. 1961-Jan. 1963: Tutor in Gastroenterology, Postgraduate Medical School of London, concurrent with the above appointment.

Dr. Homi J. Bhabha, Founding Director and Chairman of the Indian Atomic Energy Establishment, Trombay, met Jeejeebhoy and invited him to join his staff in Bombay, India. Jeejeebhoy accepted Bhabha's invitation, abandoned plans to become a Consultant in the UK, and received his PhD in 1963 from Postgraduate Medical School of London, “Albumin metabolism in gastrointestinal disease,” which was published in the British Medical Journal in 1963 under “Hypoanabolic Hypoalbuminaemia in Gastro-intestinal Disease.”

Jeejeebhoy, along with his wife and baby daughter, sailed on 14 February 1963 for India.

=== Practice -- Bombay, India ===
From March to September 1963, he was Head, Medical Division, Bhabba Atomic Research Centre, Bombay, India; April to June 1963 Staff Physician, B.Y.L., Nair Charitable Hospital, Mumbai, India; October 1963 to May 1965 in charge of Radiation Medicine, Bhabba Atomic Research Centre; and from May 1965 to December 1967, Head, Radiation Medicine Centre, Mumbai, India.

- Mar.-Sept. 1963: Head, Medical Division, Bhabba Atomic Research Centre, Bombay, India.
- Apr.-Jun. 1963: Staff Physician, B.Y.L., Nair Charitable Hospital, Mumbai, India.
- Oct. 1963-May 1965: In charge of Radiation Medicine, Bhabba Atomic Research Centre, Mumbai, India.
- May 1965-Dec.1967: Head, Radiation Medicine Centre, Mumbai, India.

His mentor and boss Dr. Homi Jehangir Bhabha died in a plane crash in 24 January 1966. With the loss of his mentor and research partner souring the work and the political atmosphere chafing him, Jeejeebhoy began looking for a new position.

A Canadian doctor, on sabbatical in Bombay, noticed Jeejeebhoy and recommended him to Dr. Keith J. R. Wightman, Chair of the Department of Medicine at the University of Toronto and Physician-in-Chief at Toronto General Hospital, as a man well suited for Wightman's burgeoning gastroenterology department. Jeejeebhoy moved to Toronto, Ontario, Canada in January 1968, and his wife, daughter, and infant son joined him on 14 February 1968.

=== Toronto, Ontario, Canada ===
He joined the University of Toronto as assistant professor, Department of Medicine in January 1968. In July 1971, he was promoted to associate professor, Department of Medicine; January 1974 he was cross-appointed Special Lecturer, Department of Nutrition, University of Toronto; July 1975, he was promoted to Professor, Department of Medicine; July 1976 cross-appointed Lecturer, Department of Nutrition and Food Science, University of Toronto; July 1979, cross-appointed Professor, Department of Nutrition and Food Science; July 1981, cross-appointed Professor, Department of Nutritional Sciences, University of Toronto; in July 1984 cross-appointed Professor, Department of Physiology, University of Toronto; and in July 2001 made professor emeritus, Department of Medicine, University of Toronto.

His positions while at Toronto General Hospital and St. Michael's Hospital included:

- Jan. 1968-Jun. 1971: Assistant Professor, Department of Medicine, University of Toronto, Toronto.
- Jan. 1968-Jan. 1970: Physician/Gastroenterologist, Toronto General Hospital, Toronto.
- Jun. 1970-to date: Member, Institute of Medical Science, University of Toronto, Toronto.
- Jul. 1970-Jun. 1990: Chief, Division of Gastroenterology, Toronto General Hospital, Toronto.
- Jul. 1985-Jun. 1990: Director, Division of Gastroenterology, University of Toronto, Toronto.
- Jul. 1970-Jun. 1990: Senior Staff Physician, Toronto General Hospital, Toronto.
- Jul. 1990-to date: Senior Staff Physician, St. Michael's Hospital, Toronto.
- Jul. 1971-Jun. 1975: Associate Professor, Department of Medicine, University of Toronto, Toronto.
- Jan. 1974-Jun. 1980: Coordinator, Division of Gastroenterology (Training Program), Department of Medicine, University of Toronto, Toronto.
- Jan. 1974-Jun. 1976: Cross-appointed Special Lecturer, Department of Nutrition, University of Toronto, Toronto.
- Jul. 1975- 2001: Professor: Department of Medicine, University of Toronto, Toronto.
- Jul. 1976-Jun. 1979: Cross-appointed Lecturer, Department of Nutrition and Food Science, University of Toronto, Toronto.
- Jul. 1979-Jun. 1981: Cross-appointed Professor, Department of Nutrition and Food Science, University of Toronto, Toronto.
- Jul. 1981- 2001: Cross-appointed Professor, Department of Nutritional Sciences, University of Toronto, Toronto.
- Jul. 1984- 2001: Cross-appointed Professor, Department of Physiology, University of Toronto, Toronto.
- July 2001-to date: Professor Emeritus Department of Medicine, University of Toronto, Toronto.
- October 2003 to date: Medical Director Gastroenterology at North York Endoscopy, 2 Champagne Drive Toronto.
- 2010 -2014: Member Canadian Malnutrition Task Force 2010-to date: Director Canadian Health Advanced by Nutrition and Graded Exercise Program
- 2014-?: Advisory Board Canadian Malnutrition Task Force
- Nov 2014-?: Central Reader for Robarts Clinical Trials Inc.

He retired fully in 2025, is married, and has three children, six grandchildren, and one great-grandchild.

== Total parenteral nutrition (TPN) research ==
=== Total parenteral nutrition ===
In 1970, Jeejeebhoy was sent a male patient with pseudo-obstruction. To send him home healthy, he had to nourish him in some way other than through eating food. At that time, he was working with his surgical colleague Dr. Bernard Langer, to nourish Langer's post-operative patients for a short period of time through parenteral nutrition. But his patient needed long-term parenteral nutrition. He spoke to colleagues and read the literature until he came across a paper in the Journal of the American Medical Association by Dr. Belding Scribner. Scribner described adapting a silicone rubber and Teflon U-shaped shunt used for home dialysis to infuse a nutritional solution. Scribner called it an artificial gut and seemed to have solved the difficult problem of how to infuse a solution permanently through a vein.

After speaking to senior colleagues and facing his patient's terminal illness, Jeejeebhoy attempted to give permanent parenteral nutrition a shot using this method although not completely convinced of its efficacy. His patient developed an embolism and died. That is when Jeejeebhoy discovered the paper was theoretical and had not described a true scenario. He told his team that in future they would go back to a central line, start from scratch, and do their own thing, which they did when Judy Taylor was sent to him from Scarborough General Hospital later that year. (Interview with Jeejeebhoy, Lifeliner)

==== Judy Ellis Taylor ====
On Wednesday, 23 September 1970, Judy Ellis Taylor presented to Scarborough General Hospital with intractable abdominal pain. She underwent emergency surgery, and the surgeons discovered about one centimetre of her bowel had died due to lack of blood supply. A week later, the surgeons re-opened her to discover the gangrene had spread to her entire intestine from the duodenum down to her descending colon. After surgery, she had no gut left, only her stomach and a stump of duodenum too short to attach to her rectum. Pathology showed that clots had formed in the submucosal veins of the intestine, preventing blood flow out of the intestines. They transferred her to Jeejeebhoy at Toronto General Hospital in a last-ditch effort to save her from death by starvation.

Unlike Langer's post-operative patients, Taylor had no bowels to absorb any nutrition; even if she tried to eat, the food had nowhere to go. Jeejeebhoy faced two problems: creating a central line that worked and working out what complete nutrition comprised. He worked with Langer on the former problem and reviewed the literature, including animal studies, to work out the second.

==== Creating a central line ====
Until Langer came up with a permanent catheter, Jeejeebhoy used the temporary plastic catheters he had reverted to after the Scribner shunt had fatally failed. These catheters fell out easily and stimulated tissue reaction, leading to clotting inside them and requiring frequent replacement. Langer heard about the tiny Silastic catheters neurosurgeons used to treat hydrocephalus. He knew that they had to be inert and able to travel long distances inside the brain not to cause tissue reaction and to stay in place for a long time. On 23 November 1970, Langer retrieved a length of sterile Silastic catheter from neurosurgery, estimating roughly the length he would need. Since this kind of catheterization had not been done before, he had no data to go on and faced the problem of where to put when they attempted it: they needed to find a vein strong enough to take the catheter and that she could manage at home, a daring possibility. The first attempt failed.

Two days later, Jeejeebhoy and Langer decide on the facial vein of entry to the jugular vein then into the subclavian to place the tip at the atrium where the high volume and pressure from the blood flow reduced the chance of clotting at the tip. This time, placement of what came to be called the “Langer Line” was successful, as determined by X-ray. The next problem was where the catheter should emerge from her skin. They decided on the anterior chest wall, which she could see to connect it herself to her parenteral nutrition. Langer glued a small piece of Teflon to the catheter tip and stitched the Teflon to the skin in order to avoid the problem of stitches in the catheter weakening it over time.

Pat Walker, the nurse on Jeejeebhoy's team, hung the alimentation bags on an IV pole and enrobed them in blood pressure cuffs. She connected the bags with tubing. Pressurized, the cuffs pushed the hyperalimentation into Judy's catheter over 24 hours. To discharge her home, Jeejeebhoy and his team weaned Taylor down to 12 hours of feeding at night, taught her how to use it, and how to psychologically cope with never eating again. Ten months after being admitted to hospital, Jeejeebhoy discharged Taylor home with her gravity-fed infusion system.

Jeejeebhoy presented on Taylor at the Ninth International Congress of Nutrition in Mexico City in September 1972, and published his findings on Taylor, calling his alimentation “Total Parenteral Nutrition,” in Gastroenterology, 1973, Volume 65. Wretlind subsequently travelled to Canada from Sweden specifically to meet Taylor and see for himself what Jeejeebhoy had accomplished. He wrote in the foreword to Lifeliner: The Judy Taylor Story:

“The successful development of [TPN], in a modern sense, was initiated in the late 1930s. However, history in this field goes back more than 350 years.

The classic case concerns a woman who was treated and investigated by Dr. Khursheed N. Jeejeebhoy and co-workers. The patient, Mrs. Judy Taylor, was operated on in September 1970 at the age of thirty-four. [She] was given a complete intravenous nutrition, first in the hospital and later in her home. She remained in good health until March 1991, when she succumbed to an infection unrelated to her TPN.

There are many patients with similar histories that have been treated with total intravenous nutrition for several years. This case treated by Dr. Khursheed Jeejeebhoy was the first showing this therapeutic possibility of complete intravenous nutrition…Dr. Khursheed Jeejeebhoy must thus be called ‘the father of complete long-term parenteral nutrition in man.’”

In 1976, Jeejeebhoy published his findings on total parenteral nutrition delivered at home to twelve patients. He along with Langer, the hospital pharmacist George Tsallas, RC Chu, A Kuksis at the Banting Institute, and professor of nutrition at University of Toronto, Harvey Anderson, wrote on their detailed studies in Gastroenterology.

Complete Nutrition

Jeejeebhoy began working on the second problem — what comprised complete nutrition — the night he admitted Taylor. She needed something to mimic real food, something to last her a lifetime not temporarily in the hospital and did not rely on some absorption of food through stomach and bowels unlike other patients. Swallowing even the tiniest morsel of food would block her G-tube, the only exit for her stomach acid. She had to live without eating.

A normal diet comprises protein, carbohydrates, fats, vitamins, trace elements, and electrolytes. The first problem was intravenous fat. American and Swedish researchers had developed different fat infusions; the American product proved toxic and so the Americans shunned fat. But Prof Arvid Wretlind, Karolinska Institute in Sweden, had developed Intralipid, a soybean-oil-based intravenous fat emulsion. Europeans had used it successfully for years.

===== Fatty Liver =====
The next question was, would a lipid emulsion lead to fatty liver as the Americans believed? He thought about how pate foie gras is made from force-feeding carbohydrates to geese to create the fatty liver loved by gourmands. He believed the same would be true of human livers: carbohydrates make livers fatty not fat. Taylor's situation would allow him to test his theory since fat intake is tightly controlled with TPN. He chose Intralipid, which was infused separately from the rest of the hyperalimentation.

After three months of in-hospital alimentation that included Intralipid, Taylor's liver biopsy showed, “mild, triadal inflammation, chronic pericholangitis, and occasional focal necrosis, but no fatty changes.” (Lifeliner) Before her discharge, Taylor's triglycerides rose, and Jeejeebhoy decided to stop the Intralipid and replace the lost calories with Dextrose. Soon after, they discovered her thyroid had been irradiated before she had been admitted to hospital and the Taylors had forgotten to tell him. Jeejeebhoy and Baun devised an IV form of l-thyroxine since she could no longer take medication in pill form. Although this cleared up her triglyceride problem, Jeejeebhoy decided this was an ideal opportunity to test out the fatty liver hypothesis, to compare the effect on the liver of carbohydrates versus fat.

In 1971, Taylor presented with symptoms of fatty acid deficiency: itchy, dry skin that moisturizer did not alleviate. Previously only animal studies and malnourished children or senior diabetics had manifested similar symptoms.

Jeejeebhoy ordered special blood tests at the Banting Institute, conducted by Kuksis. In January 1972, Jeejeebhoy admitted Taylor for a liver biopsy and the results of her blood tests. She had low levels of linoleic acid and an excess of 22-polycarbon polyunsaturates. The long-term carbohydrate infusion had increased her insulin levels high enough to lock essential fatty acids into her body fat, leading to essential fatty acid deficiency. Her liver biopsy also showed fatty changes.

Jeejeebhoy showed that lipid is required to keep fat out of the liver, and in 1990 his paper on preventing essential fatty acid deficiency appeared in Nutrition. They kept her in hospital until they determined the amount of lipids she needed.

===== Trace elements =====
He next considered trace elements. Veterinary science is often ahead of human science, and he reviewed the literature on animal studies. The night of Taylor's admission, he devised a plan, and the next morning, 7 October 1970, he met with the hospital pharmacist Dieter Baun. Baun had already set up a production centre for sterile hyperalimentation solutions for Jeejeebhoy and Langer's post-operative patients. He created Taylor's hyperalimentation that day. Her body has already begun to cannibalize her fat and muscle since she had had no nourishment for three weeks. They customized commercial solutions by injecting specific nutrients, including the trace elements of cobalt, copper, manganese, iodine, and zinc. (Later, they added selenium and chromium.)

===== Chromium =====
The original Amigen Jeejeebhoy ordered for Taylor was made from casein, which contaminated the solution with electrolytes and trace elements. In 1972, he switched Taylor to a synthetic form of Amigen to provide her with more methyl-donating groups. Although this Amigen beefed Taylor up, she no longer received the trace elements that clinicians and researchers at the time did not know were needed. Taylor developed diabetes in October 1973. Jeejeebhoy pursued multiple avenues to alleviate her inexplicable symptoms, added insulin to her regimen to no effect, and again reviewed the veterinary literature. He spoke to Walter Mertz, the animal biologist at the United States Department of Agriculture, after coming across his paper that chromium was required to promote insulin action. Mertz was unaware of any human studies in chromium.

Jeejeebhoy admitted Taylor to the hospital in January 1975 to infuse Taylor with chromium under close monitoring. The chromium eliminated the need for insulin, allowed her body to take energy from carbohydrates again not just fat, and reversed her diabetic symptoms. Jeejeebhoy and his team concluded that “isolated chromium deficiency in man, hitherto poorly documented, causes 1) glucose intolerance, 2) inability to utilize glucose for energy, 3) neuropathy with normal insulin levels, 4) high free fatty acid levels and low respiratory quotient and, 5) abnormalities of nitrogen metabolism.” Jeejeebhoy continued to study chromium in total parenteral nutrition, publishing findings on chromium deficiency mimicking “metronidazole-induced syndromes,” reviewing the potential toxicity of oral chromium supplements versus its nutritional value and use in preventing insulin resistance, and the need in 2012 to reevaluate current practices in prescribing trace elements in home parenteral nutrition in order to avoid oversupplementation and potential toxicity.

==== Vitamin D ====
Jeejeebhoy based Taylor's daily intake of 500IUs vitamin D on what was considered normal consumption in 1970: 400 IUs per day minimum. In April 1974, he found that she was receiving too much. He alternated MVI with Soluzyme, which contained no vitamin D, to cut her daily intake down to 250IUs. Her bone marrow test in 1970 while she was in hospital had been normal. On 28 March 1977, her bone biopsy showed markedly reduced bone mass and a hyperkinetic bone turnover with increase in osteoid seam and resorption sites. Vitamin D increases calcium absorption; blood calcium levels rise; consistent rise shuts off the parathyroid hormone; bone turnover stops; and the bone crumbles. When they halved Taylor's vitamin D, calcium absorption dropped; blood calcium levels dropped; parathryoid hormone began to be secreted again; and bone modelling increased. Prior to reducing vitamin D, Taylor may have developed osteomalacia (as some of subsequent TPN patients did). Although reducing her vitamin D had healed possible osteomalacia, the bone that had formed during the period without calcium got reabsorbed and then calcified, leaving Taylor with only the thin, original piece. Taylor had osteoporosis and suffered rib fractures later on. Two other TPN patients also developed bone pain and fractures; while 12, ranging from 6 to 73 months after start of parenteral nutrition, showed osteomalacia.

As a result of this discovery, Jeejeebhoy began to study bone. A prospective study, conducted with Albert Verhage, WK Cheong, and JP Allard, of the effect of long-term withrdawal of vitamin D in patients on home parenteral nutrition won the Harry M. Vars Research Award for Albert Verhage in 1995. This award “Recognizes and honors an Early Career Investigator who has submitted a top-scoring original abstract, and demonstrates excellence via a manuscript and oral presentation at the ASPEN Nutrition Science & Practice Conference.”

In 2012, Jeejeebhoy co-wrote an ASPEN position paper with the Novel Nutrient Task Force, Parenteral Multi-Vitamin and Multi–Trace Element Working Group; American Society for Parenteral and Enteral Nutrition (A.S.P.E.N.) Board of Directors recommending, “a separate parenteral vitamin D preparation (cholecalciferol or ergocalciferol) should be made available for treatment of patients with vitamin D deficiency unresponsive to oral vitamin D supplementation.” They also made recommendations on choline supplementation, modifying US multi-trace element preparations, and using single-entity trace element products when multi-trace are inappropriate.

==== Zinc ====
Because Jeejeebhoy considered complete nutrition and included zinc in Taylor's original alimentation, he did not observe acrodermatitis enteropathic in his patients. However, other centres did not include zinc, including Japan who sent a patient to him for consult (interview) and in whom he diagnosed zinc deficiency and recommended adding zinc to the patient's TPN. Jeejeebhoy estimated through balance studies that 3 mg/d in patients without gastrointestinal losses and a mean of 12 mg/d in patients with diarrhea and fistula losses, was required in TPN.

== Lactose intolerance research ==
In one of his first papers as a clinical researcher in Bombay, India, after moving there in 1963, Jeejeebhoy published the results of challenging milk intolerant patients with varying amounts of lactose and glucose-galactose.

The study, conducted at the Radiation Medicine Centre, Tata Memorial Hospital, and the Department of Gastroenterology, B. Y. L. Nair Charitable Hospital, Bombay, India, was titled “Milk Intolerance In Tropical Malabsorption Syndrome Role Of Lactose Malabsorption,” was published in The Lancet, Volume 284, Issue 7361, 26 September 1964, Pages 666–668. The authors in order were K. N. Jeejeebhoy, M.B. Madras, M.R.C.P., M.R.C.P.E., Ph.D. Lond., H. G. Desai M.D. Bombay. R. V. Verghese B.Sc. Bombay.

From the paper: “MILK intolerance has been described by (among others) Antia et al. (1955), Truelove (1961), and Sewell et al. (1963), but its cause is still obscure. Malnutrition due to defective absorption of lactose from milk was reported in two infants by Holzel et al. (1959) and lactose malabsorption was reported in seventeen children by Dahlqvist (1962). Recently, lactose malabsorption was reported in four adults with a history of milk intolerance (Dahlqvist et al. 1963, Kern et al. 1963)....The results showed that lactose — not glucose-galactose — was the culprit in creating abdominal discomfort and/or diarrhea when drinking milk.

“Milk and Fermented Milk Products: Except for one patient (case 1) all others were intolerant to milk. In these, the drinking of milk produced colicky abdominal pain and diarrhoea or made an existing state of diarrhoea worse. The amount of milk needed to produce symptoms was less than 100 ml. in five patients (cases 6, 28, 29, 31, 32); between 100 and 300 ml. in eleven patients (cases 3, 5, 7, 8, 11, 15, 16, 18, 19, 27, 30) and between 300 and 500 ml. in fifteen patients (cases 2, 4, 9, 10, 12–14, 17, 20–26). On the other hand, all patients could take fermented milk products like yogurt and buttermilk without any abdominal discomfort or diarrhoea. Only one patient (case 8) gave a history of diarrhoea since early childhood, and none of the patients had a familial history of milk intolerance.

"Lactose and Glucose-galactose: one patient (case 1), who could tolerate milk, had no symptoms after taking lactose. All other patients who were intolerant to milk began to have colicky abdominal pain and diarrhoea half an hour to two hours after taking lactose. But none of the patients had any symptom after taking a mixture of glucose and galactose.”

== Growth hormone research ==
Jeejeebhoy began studying growth hormone, beginning with its effect on albumin turnover in 1965 and fibrinogen synthesis in 1970. And he conducted a number of rat studies.

In the 21st century, the Canadian pharmaceutical company Allelix Biopharmaceuticals developed a form of growth hormone called “Teduglutide” that would lengthen the upper small bowel of patients with short bowel syndrome. Jeejeebhoy became involved in the clinical trials, having the largest group of patients with short bowel syndrome, and developed the technique of how to use the hormone. Patients with short bowel syndrome are used to being on TPN and have bad memories of eating food leading to nasty diarrhea. Jeejeebhoy created a system of withdrawing the patients slightly from TPN and providing them with small amounts of food to eat that did not lead to uncomfortable bouts of diarrhea. He also provided psychological support to alleviate their anxiety and stabilize them. Once their gut and they had psychologically readjusted to the small amount of food, he withdrew more of the TPN and added more food to their diet. This technique of repeated withdrawal and readjustment until they reached the level of no more improvement. Since the growth hormone did not restore the varied function of the small bowel, only lengthening the upper part, those patients with no or little short lower small bowel left, remained on some level of TPN, while those with functioning lower small bowel came completely off TPN. Jeejeebhoy advocated for funding for his patients with short bowel syndrome to receive this expensive rare drug.

== Heart failure and supplement research and development ==
By the end of the 20th century, Jeejeebhoy turned his research focus to heart failure from the nutritional perspective, although he had previously published several rat and clinical TPN research studies on nutritional effects on the heart.

“Several specific metabolic deficiencies have been found in the failing myocardium: (1) a reduction in L-carnitine, coenzyme Q10, creatine, and thiamine--nutrient cofactors important for myocardial energy production; (2) a relative deficiency of taurine, an amino acid integral to intracellular calcium homeostasis; (3) increased myocardial oxidative stress and a reduction of antioxidant defenses.”

He noted that single nutrients had been investigated as therapeutic agents but not a broad-based approach. In 2002, he published a paper with Dr. Michael Sole on the effect of supplementing cardiomyopathic hamsters during the late stages of the disease with taurine, coenzyme Q10, carnitine, thiamine, creatine, vitamin E, vitamin C, and selenium in a randomized placebo trial. In 2006, he along with Sole and Marc Allard, published his findings on a nutritional formula he developed with Sole to restore depleted levels of taurine, carnitine, and thiamine and that could improve myocardial structure and function as well as exercise capacity.

After working with various pharmaceutical companies to commercialize this supplement for cardiac support and energy provision, Jeejeebhoy licenced it to Seaford Pharmaceuticals. Unfortunately, despite its effectiveness at improving energy levels and exercise capacity, it had poor sales from inadequate marketing, and Seaford stopped production. He wrote a comment in 2021 American Journal of Clinical Nutrition on malnutrition in patients with heart failure.

== Malnutrition in trauma in hospital task force ==
The Canadian Malnutrition Task Force was established under the leadership of Jeejeebhoy in 2009/2010 to undertake the Nutrition Care in Canadian Hospitals Study. It was well known that hospital food is poor, yet little was known on the exact nutritional and health effects on patients pre- and post-discharge. The CMTF set out to investigate these effects and to try and change hospital food policy so that patients would have their nutritional requirements met, especially trauma patients who require total parenteral nutrition when they cannot eat but are receiving nutrition through inadequate enteral method. Jeejeebhoy's 2017 study into ICU patients concluded that supplemental parenteral nutrition in addition to enteral nutrition increased calorie and protein delivery in the first week of ICU residence versus enteral nutrition alone without increasing infection risk.

In 2017, they published their investigation into the factors associated with weight change after hospital discharge. They also investigated the costs of hospital malnutrition from the perspective of the relationship between malnutrition and hospital costs; the influence of confounders on; and from the new perspective of the drivers (medical or surgical patients or degree of malnutrition) of the relationship; and whether hospital reported cost data provide similar information to administrative data.

It revised the subjective global assessment (SGA) in 2017 to better reflect the effect of dietary intake on body composition. They published a paper in 2021 on SGA revisions to reflect the “the key concepts behind the diagnosis of malnutrition and help to distinguish this condition from other wasting conditions” And in 2022, they published their pediatric findings and proposed updates to the anthropometrics section of the Subjective Global Nutritional Assessment. Jeejeebhoy retired from the CMTF in 2022.

== CHANGE program for metabolic syndrome ==
Concerned about the health effects of metabolic syndrome and seeing the potential of his team approach to effectively treat it, Jeejeebhoy researched, developed, and launched the Canadian Health Advanced by Nutrition and Graded Exercise (CHANGE) program. He received a research grant and connected with three family practice centres across Canada to study this program. A team led by the family physician, using an individualized approach to diet and exercise, including education on the risks of metabolic syndrome and regular visits with a dietitian and kinesiologist, proved in a 2017 feasibility study to be feasible, improve aerobic capacity and diet quality, reverse MetS and improve MetS components at twelve months.

In 2022, Jeejeebhoy et al. published their paper on identifying key process-of-care measures that link to changes in diet and found that documenting food behaviour goals and behaviour change techniques were highly relevant in diet counselling. They concluded that a “diet quality score is a promising target for assessing short-term counselling success.”

The CHANGE program creates a team approach that includes stable relationships between the patient and each of the health care professionals while encouraging collaboration between the health care professionals and includes exercise, lifestyle modifications, diet, nutrition, as well as patient input into their care. This kind of team approach does not advocate nor work in a team environment where the family physician is whoever is available at the patient's appointment time. The doctor-patient relationship is important to success, as it is for any health outcome. How to implement this in clinical family practice remains a problem dependent on government medicare funding changes to support this kind of team approach and patient-centred care.

== Awards, lectureships, and distinctions ==
- Borden Award 1975, Nutrition Society of Canada, for contributions to research in nutrition by those under 45
- Canadian Association of Manufacturers of Medical Devices Award 1980 to recognize the recipient's contribution to Canadian Health Care
- McCollum Award 1982, American Society for Clinical Nutrition, for contributions to clinical nutrition research
- Sir David Cuthbertson Lectureship of the European Society for Parenteral and Enteral Nutrition, Vienna, Austria 27 September 1982 on micronutrients - state of the art
- Sir Arthur Hurst Lectureship of the British Society of Gastroenterology, York, United Kingdom, 29 September 1983 on Changes in body composition and objectives of nutritional support
- India Medical Association Recognition Award Chicago, Illinois, 10 December 1983, for in his field of medicine, outstanding achievements which are widely recognized in North America
- International Honourable Member of the French Society of Gastroenterology 1986
- Crampton Award for Distinguished Service in Nutrition 1987, Faculty of Agriculture, Macdonald College of McGill University, Montreal, Quebec. Given in recognition of significant contributions in the field of nutrition through research and/or service Muscle function and nutrition.
- Varis Award 1988 Henkel Corporation, Laguna Niguel, California for outstanding research in vitamin E.
- Astra Foundation Lecture given to the Caledonian Society of Gastroenterology 22 February 1991, Edinburgh, Scotland. The effect of nutrition on body composition, function and outcome.
- American College of Nutrition Award, 8–11 October 1993, Chicago, Illinois, Annual Meeting of the College of Nutrition, Total parenteral and enteral nutrition.
- Dales Award of the University of Toronto 1993 in recognition of contributions made to knowledge through the recipient's research over many years. How do you feed the sick individual most effectively?
- Finkelstein Prize 13 October 1995, Crohn's and Colitis Foundation of Canada, Toronto, Ontario, in recognition of outstanding contributions to the field of nutrition in inflammatory bowel diseases
- Research Award from the Canadian Association of Gastroenterology 1996
- Department of Medicine Research Award at University of Toronto 1997
- Distinguished Service Award from the Canadian Association of Gastroenterology 1998
- Distinguished Service Award from the Ontario Association of Gastroenterology 2000
- C. Richard Fleming Lecture, Mayo Foundation 2002
- Awarded Honorary Membership of ESPEN, European Society for Clinical Nutrition and Metabolism August 2005
- Christian Medical College, Vellore, India, In recognition of his outstanding contribution to the medical field: "An accomplished researcher in the field of Nutritional Sciences; A tireless scholare in Gastroenterology; A great believer in technology as a tool for healthcare; A thinker with extraordinary publications; A role model for medical fraternity." 23 November 2006
- Gold Medal by the Canadian Association of Physicians of Indian Origin 2010
- AGA Institute Council Nutrition and Obesity Section Research Mentor Award to honor outstanding contributions as a mentor to those in the field of Nutrition, May 2011
- Elected Fellow of the American Society of Parenteral and Enteral Nutrition, February 2013
- Lifetime Achievement Award from Crohn's and Colitis Canada 2018
- Certificate of Service, College of Physicians and Surgeons of Ontario, Chair of Peer Assessment Network 2006–2021
- University of Toronto Gastroenterology and Hepatology, Department of Medicine, The Legend in Gastroenterology and Hepatology in 2022
- Canadian Nutrition Society Nutrition Care Champion Award 2022
- Living Legend of International union of Nutritional Sciences at the 22nd IUNS-ICN International Congress of Nutrition, Tokyo, Japan, December 2022

=== Teaching awards ===
- Teaching Award, St. Michael's Hospital, 1994
- Dr. Arthur Squires Teaching Award 2002
- Dr. Arthur Squires Teaching Award 2003
- Dr. Arthur Squires Club Teaching Award 2004 to 2005
- Ivan Beck Excellence in Teaching Award of Canadian Association of Gastroenterology 2005

=== Awards in his name ===
The Dr. K. N. Jeejeebhoy Award for Excellence in Gastroenterology was established in 2005 and first awarded in 2006. It is given to the gastroenterology resident at the University of Toronto who best exemplifies the type of clinician researcher Dr. Jeejeebhoy has been all his career. Dr. Rupert Abdalian won the first one in 2007.

The inaugural Khursheed Jeejeebhoy Award for Best Application of Clinical Nutrition Research Findings to Clinical Practice by the Canadian Society of Nutrition was given to Dr. David Jenkins in 2010.

== Membership of societies, past and present ==
1. American Association of Physicians.
2. American Society for Clinical Investigation.
3. American Society for Clinical Nutrition.
4. American Institute of Nutrition.
5. American Gastroenterological Association.
6. American Society for Parenteral and Enteral Nutrition (ASPEN).
7. Canadian Association of Gastroenterology.
8. Canadian Society for Clinical Investigation.
9. Nutrition Society of Canada.
10. Ontario and Canadian Medical Associations.

== Extramural activities ==
1. American Gastroenterological Association Research Committee (1977–1979).
2. American Society for Clinical Nutrition: (a) Awards Chairman (1983–1984), (b) Councilor (1990–1993), (c) Chairman, Program Committee (1992).
3. Medical Research Council of Canada: (a) Reviewer for Grants, (b) Member of Grant Committee for Experimental Medicine.
4. Selected Summaries Contributor to Gastroenterology (U.S.A.) (1980–1989).
5. American Society for Parenteral and Enteral Nutrition: (a) Director at Large (1990–1991), (b) Chairman, Research Committee (1991–1992), (c) Chairman, Abstract Review Committee (1994–1996).
6. Human Nutrition Research Center on Aging at Tufts University: Scientific Advisory Committee (1991).
7. United States Pharmacopeial Convention: Nutrition Advisory Committee (1991 to 1995).
8. Abstract Reviewer for European Society for Parenteral and Enteral Nutrition (1991).
9. Journal of Parenteral and Enteral Nutrition: Editorial Board (1993–1999).
10. Nutrition Post: Medical Consultant (1994 to 1996).
11. Nutrition and Medical Post: Contributor (1996 to ?)
12. Advisory Board of Nature Clinical Practice Gastroenterology & Hepatology (2004 to ?)
13. Elected Fellow of American Gastroenterological Association, 1 January 2010.

== Works: books and chapters ==
- Total Parenteral Nutrition in the Hospital and at Home, (ISBN 978-1-315-89823-0) - Published in 2017
1. Jeejeebhoy, K.N. The use of an ion-exchange resin to measure gastrointestinal albumin catabolism. (A new method). In: Plasma Proteins and Gastrointestinal Tract in Health and Disease, eds. M. Schwartz and P. Vein. Munksgaard Ltd., Copenhagen, Denmark, pp. 59–68, 1962. (Proceedings of the International Symposium in Paris, France, August 1961.)
2. Jeejeebhoy, K.N., H.G. Desai, J.M. Noronha and F.P. Antia. Tropical malabsorption syndrome. Proceedings of the First Asian Congress of Gastroenterology, India, 1964.
3. Jeejeebhoy, K.N. Endogenous protein loss into the bowel as a cause of hypoalbuminaemia. In: The Role of the Gastrointestinal Tract in Protein Metabolism, ed. H.N. Munro. Blackwell Scientific Publications, Oxford, U.K., pp. 357–383, 1964.
4. Jeejeebhoy, K.N., B. Singh, R.S. Mani and S.M. Sanjana. The use of Nb95-labelled albumin in the study of gastrointestinal protein loss. In: Physiology and Pathophysiology of Plasma Protein Metabolism, eds. H. Koblet, P. Vesin, H. Diggelmann and S. Barandum. Verlag Hans Huber, Bern und Stuttgart, West Germany, pp. 61–67, 1965.
5. Jeejeebhoy, K.N. Radioisotopic techniques for the study of protein absorption. In: Radioisotope Techniques in the Study of Protein Metabolism. Technical Reports Series, No.45, International Atomic Energy Agency, Vienna, Austria, pp. 141–148, 1965.
6. Jeejeebhoy, K.N. The preparation of H3-labelled proteins. In: Radioisotope Techniques in the Study of Protein Metabolism. Technical Reports Series, No.45, International Atomic Energy Agency, Vienna, Austria, pp. 41–47, 1965.
7. Jeejeebhoy, K.N., A. Bruce-Robertson, J. Ho and U. Sodtke. The comparative effects of nutritional and hormonal factors on the synthesis of albumin, fibrinogen and transferrin. In: Protein Turnover - Ciba Foundation Symposium 9 (new series) 1972, Associated Sciences Publishers (Elsevier - Excerpta Medica - North-Holland), Amsterdam, The Netherlands, pp. 217–247, 1973.
8. Jeejeebhoy, K.N., G.H. Anderson, I. Sanderson and M.H. Bryan. Total parenteral nutrition. In: Tenth Symposium on Advanced Medicine, ed. J.G.G. Ledingham. Pitman Medical, London, U.K., pp. 132–153, 1974. (Proceedings of a Conference held at the Royal College of Physicians of London, U.K. - 18–22 February 1974.)
9. Jeejeebhoy, K.N., J. Ho, U. Sodtke, M.J. Phillips, G.R. Greenberg and A. Bruce-Robertson. Free liver cells in the study of albumin synthesis and the effect of ethanol. In: Alcoholic Liver Pathology, eds. J.M. Khanna, Y. Israel and H. Kalant. Alcoholism and Drug Addiction Research Foundation of Ontario, Toronto, ON., Canada, pp. 351–356, 1975. (Proceedings of the International Symposia on Alcohol and Drug Research, October 1973.)
10. Jeejeebhoy, K.N., A. Bruce-Robertson, J. Ho and U. Sodtke. The effect of ethanol on albumin and fibrinogen synthesis in vivo and in hepatocyte suspensions, chapter 17. In: Alcohol and Abnormal Protein Biosynthesis, Biochemical and Clinical, Sect. 4, eds. M.A. Rothschild, M. Oratz and S.S. Schreiber. Pergamon Press Inc., New York, N.Y., pp. 373–391, 1975.
11. Jeejeebhoy, K.N. Absorption of proteins and amino acids. In: Radioactive Tracer Techniques for the Study of Gastrointestinal Absorption. Technical Document IAEA-188, International Atomic Energy Agency, Vienna, Austria, pp. 158–168, 1976. (Proceedings of a panel organized by the International Atomic Energy Agency, Vienna, Austria, 16–20 July 1973.)
12. Jeejeebhoy, K.N., E.B. Marliss, G.H. Anderson, G.R. Greenberg, A. Kuksis and C. Breckenridge. In: Lipid in Parenteral Nutrition. Studies of Clinical and Metabolic Features, eds. H.C. Meng and D.W. Wilmore. Fat Emulsions in Parenteral Nutrition, American Medical Association, Chicago, IL., pp. 45–54, 1976.
13. Jeejeebhoy, K.N. 1. Protein sparing effect of amino acids. In: Clinical Nutrition Update: Amino Acids, eds. H.L. Greene, M.A. Holliday and H.N. Munro. American Medical Association, Chicago, IL., pp. 65–72, 1977.
14. Jeejeebhoy, K.N. 2. Role of measuring albumin synthesis as a way of measuring protein body repletion. In: Clinical Nutrition Update: Amino Acids, eds. H.L. Greene, M.A. Holliday and H.N. Munro. American Medical Association, Chicago, IL., pp. 130–133, 1977.
15. Jeejeebhoy, K.N. Relationship of energy and protein input to nitrogen retention and substrate-hormone profile. In: Current Concepts in Parenteral Nutrition, eds. J.M. Greep, P.B. Soeters, R.I.C. Wesdorp, C.W.R. Phaf and J.E. Fischer. Martinus Nijhoff Medical Division, The Hague, The Netherlands, pp. 313–322, 1977.
16. Phillips, M.J., M. Oda, I. Yousef, M.M. Fisher, K.N. Jeejeebhoy and K. Funatsu. Microfilaments and cholestasis: selected electron microscopic and cytochemical observations: In: Membrane Alterations as Basis of Liver Injury, eds. H. Popper, L. Bianchi and W. Reutter. MTP Press Ltd., Lancaster, U.K., pp. 343–352, 1977. (Falk Symposium 22.)
17. Jeejeebhoy, K.N. Nutritional requirements of cells in cultures: liver. In: CRC Handbook Series in Nutrition and Food, ed. M. Rechcigl Jr. CRC Press Inc., Boca Raton, FL., 1978.
18. Kaminski, M.V. Jr. and K.N. Jeejeebhoy. Nutritional assessment and intravenous support. Indications for intravenous hyperalimentation. Medical Directions, Inc., Chicago, IL. (Abbott Laboratories, North Chicago, IL.), June 1978. (Physician's Monograph.)
19. McNeill, K.G., J.R. Mernagh, K.N. Jeejeebhoy and J.E. Harrison. In vivo determinations of nitrogen in wasting disease. In: Nuclear Activation Techniques in the Life Sciences, 1978. International Atomic Energy Agency, Austria, pp. 799–807, 1979.
20. Jeejeebhoy, K.N. Comparative study of the clearance of Liposyn and Intralipid. In: Liposyn Research Conference Proceedings, ed. A.L. Barlow. Abbott Laboratories, North Chicago, IL., pp. 41–47, 1979.
21. Jones, G., B. Byrnes, D. Duthie and K.N. Jeejeebhoy. Contribution of skin vitamin D3 synthesis in patients receiving total parenteral nutrition. In: Vitamin D, Basic Research and Its Clinical Application, eds. A.W. Norman, K. Schaefer, D.V. Herrath, M.-G. Grigoleit, J.W. Coburn, H.F. DeLuca, E.B. Mawer and T. Suda. Walter de Gruyter, Berlin, West Germany, pp. 169–172, 1979. (Proceedings of the Fourth Workshop on Vitamin D, Berlin, West Germany, February 1979.)
22. Jeejeebhoy, K.N. The role of fat in parenteral nutrition. In: Profiles in Nutritional Management. Medical Directions Inc., Chicago, IL., pp. 1–33, 1980.
23. Jeejeebhoy, K.N. Dietary therapy and parenteral nutrition, Chap. 78. In: Harrison's Principles of Internal Medicine, 9th ed., eds. K.J. Isselbacher, R.D. Adams, E. Braunwald, R.G. Petersdorf and J.D. Wilson. McGraw-Hill Book Co., New York, N.Y., pp. 418–424, 1980.
24. Jeejeebhoy, K.N. Total parenteral nutrition. The dual-energy system: The metabolic rationale. Cutter Laboratories, Berkeley, CA., pp. 8–13, 1980.
25. Jeejeebhoy, K.N., ed. Gastrointestinal Diseases: Focus on Clinical Diagnosis, 1st ed.. Medical Examination Publishing Co. Inc., Garden City, N.Y., pp. 1–446, 1980.
26. Marliss, E.B. and K.N. Jeejeebhoy. Fuel fluxes in parenteral nutrition: the role of insulin and its possible implications in diabetes. In: Diabetes 1979, ed. W.K. Waldhausl. Excerpta Medica, Amsterdam, The Netherlands, pp. 296–301, 1980. (Proceedings of the Tenth Congress of the International Diabetes Federation, Vienna, Austria, September 1979.)
27. Shike, M., M. Roulet and K.N. Jeejeebhoy. Nutrition, Chap. 12. In: Current Gastroenterology, Vol. 1, ed. G.L. Gitnick. Houghton Mifflin Professional Publishers, Boston, MA., pp. 401–443, 1980.
28. Jeejeebhoy, K.N. Factors controlling the utilization of protein. In: Nutritional Factors: Modulating Effects on Metabolic Processes, eds. R.F. Beers Jr. and E.G. Bassett. Raven Press, New York, N.Y., pp. 309–322, 1981. (Miles International Symposium Series Number 13.)
29. Greenberg, G.R. and K.N. Jeejeebhoy. Total parenteral nutrition (TPN) in the primary management of Crohn's disease. In: Developments in Gastroenterology, Vol. 1: Recent Advances in Crohn's Disease, eds. A.S. Pena, I.T. Weterman, C.C. Booth and W. Strober. Martinus Nijhoff Publishers, The Hague, The Netherlands, pp. 492–498, 1981.
30. Jeejeebhoy, K.N. Trace element requirements in parenteral nutrition. In: Nutritional Assessment - Present Status, Future Directions and Prospects, ed. S.M. Levenson. Ross Laboratories, Columbus, OH., pp. 76–77, 1981. (Report of the Second Ross Conference on Medical Research.)
31. Hill, G.L., K.N. Jeejeebhoy and J.M. Kinney, eds. Parenteral Nutrition/Canada. Present Status and Newer Developments. Communications Media for Education, Inc., Princeton Junction, N.J., pp. 1–110, 1981. (Proceedings of a Canadian Symposium.)
32. Jeejeebhoy, K.N. Macronutrients and micronutrients in parenteral nutrition. Protein. In: Parenteral Nutrition/Canada. Present Status and Newer Developments, eds. G.L. Hill, K.N. Jeejeebhoy and J.M. Kinney. Communications Media for Education, Inc., Princeton, Junction, N.J., pp. 1–3, 1981. (Proceedings of a Canadian Symposium.)
33. Jeejeebhoy, K.N. Applications of home TPN. In: Parenrteral Nutrition/Canada. Present Status and Newer Developments, eds. G.L. Hill, K.N. Jeejeebhoy and J.M. Kinney. Communications Media for Education, Inc., Princeton Junction, N.J., pp. 99–102–110, 1981. (Proceedings of a Canadian Symposium.)
34. Jeejeebhoy, K.N. Intravenous nutrition - an overview, Chap. 8. In: Nutrition and the Surgical Patient, ed. G.L. Hill. Churchill Livingstone, Edinburgh, U.K., pp. 118–132, 1981. (Clinical Surgery International, Vol. 2.)
35. Jeejeebhoy, K.N. Access and pumping systems. In: Home Parenteral Nutrition, ed. E. Steiger. Pro Clinica Inc. (for A.S.P.E.N.), New York, N.Y., pp. 32–35, 198l. (Proceedings of a Comprehensive Symposium on Total Parenteral Nutrition in the Home.)
36. Jeejeebhoy, K.N. Meeting nutrient requirements of the HPN patient. In: Home Parenteral Nutrition, ed. E. Steiger. Pro Clinica Inc. (for A.S.P.E.N.), New York, N.Y., pp. 35–38, 1981. (Proceedings of a Comprehensive Symposium on Total Parenteral Nutrition in the Home.)
37. Baker, J.P. and K.N. Jeejeebhoy. Nutrition, Chap. 12. In: Current Gastroenterology, Vol. 2, ed. G.L. Gitnick. John Wiley & Sons, Inc., New York, N.Y., pp. 515–53l, 1982.
38. Jeejeebhoy, K.N. Nutricion parenteral y dietas elementales (Parenteral nutrition and elemental diets), Chap. 147. In: Tratado de Gastroenterologia y Hepatologia (Textbook of Gastroenterology and Hepatology), Vol. 2, eds. D.S. Cantor and R.J. Groszman. Salvat Editores S.A. Barcelona, Spain, pp. 1279–1290, 1982.
39. Jeejeebhoy, K.N. Foreword. In: Balanced Parenteral Nutrition. Medical Directions Inc., Chicago, IL., pp. 2–3, 1982.
40. Jeejeebhoy, K.N. and D.McR. Russell. Clinical applications of total parenteral nutrition with fat. In: Balanced Parenteral Nutrition, ed. E. Morrison. Medical Directions Inc., Chicago, IL., pp. 30–40, 1982.
41. Jeejeebhoy, K.N. Trace element requirements during total parenteral nutrition, Chap. 25. In: Clinical, Biochemical, and Nutritional Aspects of Trace Elements, Vol. 6, ed. A.S. Prasad. Alan R. Liss, Inc., New York, N.Y., pp. 469–476, 1982.
42. Jeejeebhoy, K.N. Principles and practice of home parenteral nutrition, Chap. 31. In: Idiopathic Inflammatory Bowel Disease: Crohn's Disease and Chronic Ulcerative Colitis. The Past, Present and Future Prospective, lst ed., ed. A.B.R. Thomson for the Canadian Foundation for Ileitis and Colitis. The Canadian Public Health Association, Ottawa, ON., Canada, pp. 324–330, 1982.
43. Jeejeebhoy, K.N. and J. Whitwell. Merlin: a flexible database system for microcomputers. In: Frontiers of Engineering in Health Care - 1982, eds. A.R. Potvin and J.H. Potvin. IEEE Service Center, Piscataway, N.J., pp. 375–377, 1982. (Proceedings of the Fourth Annual Conference IEEE Engineering in Medicine and Biology Society.)
44. Jeejeebhoy, K.N. Malnutrition and effects of nutritional support in the malnourished patient. In: Nutritional Support of the Seriously Ill Patient, eds. R.W. Winters and H.L. Greene. Academic Press, New York, N.Y., pp. 207–222, 1983. (Proceedings of the First Annual Bristol-Myers Symposium on Nutrition Research, held 9–10 November 1981 in Washington, D.C.)
45. Jeejeebhoy, K.N. Amino acid metabolism as studied in the isolated hepatocyte, Chap. 11. In: Amino Acids: Metabolism and Medical Applications, eds. G.L. Blackburn, J.P. Grant and V.R. Young. John Wright-PSG Inc., Boston, MA., pp. 183–187, 1983.
46. Jeejeebhoy, K.N. and J.P. Baker. Parenteral nutrition, Chap. 82. In: Harrison's Principles of Internal Medicine, 10th ed., eds. R.G. Petersdorf, R.D. Adams, E. Braunwald, K.J. Isselbacher, J.B. Martin and J.D. Wilson. McGraw-Hill Book Co., New York, N.Y., pp. 457–461, 1983.
47. Russell, D. McR., G. Tsallas, D.A. Pipa and K.N. Jeejeebhoy. Trace elements in parenteral nutrition. In: Biological Aspects of Metals and Metal-Related Diseases, ed. B. Sarkar. Raven Press, New York, N.Y., pp. 121–132, 1983.
48. Jeejeebhoy, K.N., Z. Cohen, G. Kennedy and G. Tsallas. Total Parenteral Nutrition in the Hospital and at Home, ed. K.N. Jeejeebhoy. CRC Press, Inc., Boca Raton, FL., pp. 1–255, 1983.
49. Jeejeebhoy, K.N. and E.B. Marliss. Energy supply in total parenteral nutrition, Chap. 21. In: Surgical Nutrition, 1st. ed., ed. J.E. Fischer. Little, Brown & Co., Boston, MA., pp. 645–662, 1983.
50. Jeejeebhoy, K.N. Micronutrients - state of the art (Sir David Cuthbertson Lecture). In: New Aspects of Clinical Nutrition, eds. G. Kleinberger and E. Deutsch. Basel, Karger, pp. 1–24, 1983. (Proceedings of the Fourth Congress of E.S.P.E.N., Vienna, Austria, September 1982.)
51. Russell, D.McR. and K.N. Jeejeebhoy. Nutrition in cancer. In: Current Therapy in Hematology-Oncology, 1983–1984, eds. M.C. Brain and P.B. McCulloch. B.C. Decker Inc., Burlington, ON., Canada, pp. 287–289, 1983.
52. Russell, D.M. and K.N. Jeejeebhoy. Radionuclide assessment of nutritional depletion, Chap. 4. In: Nutritional Assessment, eds. R.A. Wright and S. Heymsfield. Blackwell Scientific Publications, Inc., Boston, MA., pp. 83–109, 1984.
53. Russell, D.McR. and K.N. Jeejeebhoy. The assessment of the functional consequences of malnutrition, Chap. 8. In: Nutrition in the 20th Century, ed. M. Winick. John Wiley & Sons, New York, N.Y., pp. 113–135, 1984.
54. Jeejeebhoy, K.N. Micronutrients - state of the art. In: Parenteral and Enteral Hyperalimentation, eds. S. Ogoshi and A. Okada. Elsevier Science Publishers B.V. (Excerpta Medica, International Congress Series 649), Amsterdam, The Netherlands, pp. 93–113, 1984. (Proceedings of the International Symposium on Parenteral and Enteral Nutrition, Kochi, Japan, November 1983.)
55. Jeejeebhoy, K.N. Parenteral alimentation. In: Current Therapy in Gastroenterology and Liver Disease 1984–1985, ed. T.M. Bayless. B.C. Decker Inc., Burlington, ON., Canada. pp. 206–212, 1984.
56. Jeejeebhoy, K.N. Nutrition in critical illness. In: Critical Care - State of the Art, Vol. 5, ed. W.C. Shoemaker. The Society of Critical Care Medicine, Fullerton, CA., pp. V(B):1-74, 1984.
57. Ostro, M.J. and K.N. Jeejeebhoy. Metabolic consequences of total parenteral nutrition, Chap. 13. In: Nutritional Biochemistry and Metabolism: With Clinical Applications, ed. M.C. Linder. Elsevier Science Publishing Co., Inc., New York, N.Y., pp. 309–330, 1985.
58. Jeejeebhoy, K.N. Nutritional support of the critically ill patient. In: Update in Intensive Care and Emergency Medicine, ed. J.L. Vincent. Springer-Verlag, Berlin, West Germany, pp. 152–159, 1985. (Proceedings of the Fifth International Symposium on Intensive Care and Emergency Medicine, Brussels, Belgium, March 1985.)
59. Jeejeebhoy, K.N., M.L. Halperin and D.Z. Levine. Total parenteral nutrition, Chap. 26. In: Fluid, Electrolyte, and Acid-Base Disorders, Vol. II, eds. A.I. Arieff and R.A. DeFronzo. Churchill Livingstone, New York, N.Y., pp. 1191–1210, 1985.
60. Jeejeebhoy, K.N. Energy metabolism in the critically ill, Chap. 10. In: Substrate and Energy Metabolism in Man, eds. J.S. Garrow and D. Halliday. John Libbey & Co. Ltd., London, U.K., pp. 93–101, 1985.
61. Russell, D.M., M. Close and K.N. Jeejeebhoy. Peripheral total parenteral nutrition, Chap. 7. In: Hyperalimentation: A Guide for Clinicians, ed. M.V. Kaminski Jr. Marcel Dekker, Inc., New York, N.Y., pp. 155–170, 1985.
62. Russell, D.M., J.P. Baker and K.N. Jeejeebhoy. Trace elements and vitamins in parenteral nutrition, Chap. 22. In: Hyperalimentation: A Guide for Clinicians, ed. M.V. Kaminski Jr. Marcel Dekker, Inc., New York, N.Y., pp. 591–606, 1985.
63. Jeejeebhoy, K.N. Carbohydrate-lipid utilization: mixed fuel delivery for total parenteral nutrition, Chap. 9. In: Nutrition in Clinical Surgery, 2nd ed., ed. M. Deitel. Williams & Wilkins, Baltimore, MD., pp. 121–130, 1985.
64. Jeejeebhoy, K.N., M. Shike, W.C. Sturtridge, C.S. Tam, G. Jones, T.M. Murray and J.E. Harrison. Total parenteral nutrition bone disease at Toronto, Chap. 2. In: Metabolic Bone Disease in Total Parenteral Nutrition, eds. J.W. Coburn and G.L. Klein. Urban & Schwartzenberg, Baltimore, MD., pp. 17–29, 1985.
65. Harrison, J.E., K.N. Jeejeebhoy and N.S. Track. The effect of total parenteral nutrition (TPN) on bone mass, Chap. 4. In: Metabolic Bone Disease in Total Parenteral Nutrition, eds. J.W. Coburn and G.L. Klein. Urban & Schwarzenberg, Baltimore, MD., pp. 53–61, 1985.
66. TAM, C.S. and K.N. Jeejeebhoy. Bone changes in patients on total parenteral nutrition: follow-up by sequential bone biopsies, Chap. 6. In: Metabolic Bone Disease in Total Parenteral Nutrition, eds. J.W. Coburn and G.L. Klein. Urban & Schwarzenberg, Baltimore, MD., pp. 73–87, 1985.
67. Jeejeebhoy, K.N., ed. Gastrointestinal Diseases: Focus on Clinical Diagnosis, 2nd ed. Medical Examination Publishing Co., Inc., New Hyde Park, N.Y., pp. 1–446, 1985.
68. Jeejeebhoy, K.N. Changes in body composition and muscle function and effect of nutritional support. In: Proceedings of the Thirteenth International Congress of Nutrition, eds. T.G. Taylor and N.K. Jenkins. John Libbey & Co. Ltd., London, U.K., pp. 680–682, 1986. (Brighton, U.K., 18–23 August 1985.)
69. Jeejeebhoy, K.N. Malabsorption and the short-gut syndrome, Chap. 25. In: Clinical Nutrition, Parenteral Nutrition, Vol. 2, eds. J.L. Rombeau and M.D. Caldwell. W.B. Saunders Co., Philadelphia, PA., pp. 437–444, 1986.
70. Halperin, M.L., K.N. Jeejeebhoy and D.Z. Levine. Acid-base, fluid and electrolyte aspects of parenteral nutrition, Chap. 22. In: Fluids and Electrolytes, eds. J.P. Kokko and R.L. Tannen. W.B. Saunders Co., Philadelphia, PA., pp. 817–83l, 1986.
71. Jeejeebhoy, K.N. Assessment of nutritional status: the relative merits of anthropometry, plasma proteins and muscle function, Chap. 13. In: The Scientific Basis for the Care of the Critically Ill, eds. R.A. Little and K.N. Frayn. Manchester University Press, Manchester, U.K., pp. 197–213, 1986.
72. Wolman, S.L., K.N. Jeejeebhoy, S. Stewart and P.D. Greig. Experience in home parenteral nutrition and indications for small-bowel transplantation. In: Small-Bowel Transplantation, eds. E. Deltz, A. Thiede and H. Hamelmann. Springer-Verlag, Berlin, West Germany, pp. 214–221, 1986.
73. Ostro, M.J. and K.N. Jeejeebhoy. Nutritional support of patients with inflammatory bowel disease, Chap. 15. In: Inflammatory Bowel Disease, eds. F.T. de Dombal, J. Myren, I.A.D. Bouchier and G. Watkinson. Oxford University Press, Oxford, U.K., pp. 476–503, 1986.
74. Blendis, L.M., J.E. Harrison, J.R. Mernagh, K.N. Jeejeebhoy, K.G. McNeill and S. Krishnan. Experience in the use of body composition studies in gastroenterology, Chap. 5. In: In-Vivo Body Composition Studies, eds. K.J. Ellis, S. Yasumura and W.D. Morgan. Institute of Physical Sciences in Medicine, London, U.K., pp. 44–50, 1987. (Brookhaven National Laboratory, New York, N.Y., September–October 1986.)
75. Jeejeebhoy, K.N. and J.P. Baker. Parenteral nutrition, Chap. 75. In: Harrison's Principles of Internal Medicine, 11th ed., eds. E. Braunwald, K.J. Isselbacher, R.G. Petersdorf, J.D. Wilson, J.B. Martin and A.S. Fauci. McGraw-Hill Book Co., New York, N.Y., pp. 406–410, 1987.
76. Jeejeebhoy, K.N. (organizer). Nutrition and diet in management of diseases of the gastrointestinal tract, Chap. 56. In: Modern Nutrition in Health and Disease, 7th ed., eds. M.E. Shils and V.R. Young. Lea & Febiger, Philadelphia, PA., pp. 1092–1200, 1988.
77. Desai, M.B. and K.N. Jeejeebhoy. Nutrition and esophageal disease. In: Nutrition and diet in management of diseases of the gastrointestinal tract, Chap. 56. In: Modern Nutrition in Health and Disease, 7th ed., eds. M.E. Shils and V.R. Young, Lea & Febiger, Philadelphia, PA., pp. 1092–1093, 1988.
78. Desai, M.B. and K.N. Jeejeebhoy. Diet and peptic ulcer disease. In: Nutrition and diet in management of diseases of the gastrointestinal tract, Chap. 56. In: Modern Nutrition in Health and Disease, 7th ed., eds. M.E. Shils and V.R. Young. Lea & Febiger, Philadelphia, PA., pp. 1099–1102, 1988.
79. Desai, M.B. and K.N. Jeejeebhoy. Nutrition and surgery for peptic ulcer. In: Nutrition and diet in management of diseases of the gastrointestinal tract, Chap. 56. In: Modern Nutrition and Health and Disease, 7th ed., eds. M.E. Shils and V.R. Young. Lea & Febiger, Philadelphia, PA., pp. 1103–1107, 1988.
80. Desai, M.B. and K.N. Jeejeebhoy. Effects of intestinal disease on digestion and absorption. In: Nutrition and diet in management of diseases of the gastrointestinal tract, Chap. 56. In: Modern Nutrition in Health and Disease, 7th ed., eds. M.E. Shils and V.R. Young. Lea & Febiger, Philadelphia, PA., pp. 1124–1129, 1988.
81. Desai, M.B. and K.N. Jeejeebhoy. Fluid and electrolyte exchange in the intestinal tract. In: Nutrition and diet in management of diseases of the gastrointestinal tract, Chap. 56. In: Modern Nutrition in Health and Disease, 7th ed., eds. M.E. Shils and V.R. Young. Lea & Febiger, Philadelphia, PA., pp. 1130–1134, 1988.
82. Desai, M.B. and K.N. Jeejeebhoy. Nutritional support of patients with short bowel syndrome and malabsorption. In: Nutrition and diet in management of diseases of the gastrointestinal tract, Chap. 56. In: Modern Nutrition in Health and Disease, 7th ed., eds. M.E. Shils and V.R. Young. Lea & Febiger, Philadelphia, PA., pp. 1144– 1150, 1988.
83. Jeejeebhoy, K.N., ed. Current Therapy in Nutrition. B.C. Decker Inc., Burlington, ON., Canada, pp. 1–497, 1988.
84. Jeejeebhoy, K.N. Short bowel syndrome. In: Nutrition and gastrointestinal disease. In: Current Therapy in Nutrition, ed. K.N. Jeejeebhoy. B.C. Decker Inc., Burlington, ON., Canada, pp. 135–141, 1988.
85. Jeejeebhoy, K.N. Intestinal pseudo-obstruction. In: Nutrition and gastrointestinal disease. In: Current Therapy in Nutrition, ed. K.N. Jeejeebhoy. B.C. Decker Inc., Burlington, ON., Canada, pp. 150–154, 1988.
86. Jeejeebhoy, K.N. Jaundice. In: Nutrition and liver disease. In: Current Therapy in Nutrition, ed. K.N. Jeejeebhoy. B.C. Decker Inc., Burlington, ON., Canada, pp. 179–181, 1988.
87. Jeejeebhoy, K.N. Diet therapy complications. In: Other considerations. In: Current Therapy in Nutrition, ed. K.N. Jeejeebhoy. B.C. Becker Inc., Burlington, ON., Canada, pp. 390–400, 1988.
88. Jeejeebhoy, K.N. and M.J. Ostro. Nutritional consequences and therapy in inflammatory bowel disease, Chap. 24. In: Inflammatory Bowel Disease, 3rd ed., eds. J.B. Kirsner and R.G. Shorter. Lea & Febiger, Philadelphia, PA., pp. 513–528, 1988.
89. Kinney, J.M., K.N. Jeejeebhoy, G.L. Hill and O.E. Owen. Nutrition and Metabolism in Patient Care. W.B. Saunders Co., Philadelphia, PA., pp. 1–797, 1988.
90. Jeejeebhoy, K.N. Nutrient metabolism, Chap. 3. In: Nutrition and Metabolism in Patient Care, eds. J.M. Kinney, K.N. Jeejeebhoy, G.L. Hill and O.E. Owen. W.B. Saunders Co., Philadelphia, PA., pp. 60–88, 1988.
91. Desai, M.B. and K.N. Jeejeebhoy. Peptic ulcer, Chap. 12. In: Nutrition and Metabolism in Patient Care, eds. J.M. Kinney, K.N. Jeejeebhoy, G.L. Hill and O.E. Owen. W.B. Saunders Co., Philadelphia, PA., pp. 237–242, 1988.
92. Jeejeebhoy, K.N. Short bowel syndrome, Chap. 14. In: Nutrition and Metabolism in Patient Care, eds. J.M. Kinney, K.N. Jeejeebhoy, G.L. Hill and O.E. Owen. W.B. Saunders Co., Philadelphia, PA., pp. 259–265, 1988.
93. Jeejeebhoy, K.N. The functional basis of assessment, Chap. 42. In: Nutrition and Metabolism in Patient Care, eds. J.M. Kinney, K.N. Jeejeebhoy, G.L. Hill and O.E. Owen. W.B. Saunders Co., Philadelphia, PA., pp. 739–751, 1988.
94. Jeejeebhoy, K.N. Enteral and parenteral nutrition, Chap. 45. In: Critical Care, eds. J.M. Civetta, R.W. Taylor and R.R. Kirby. J.B. Lippincott Co., Philadelphia, PA., pp. 513–534, 1988.
95. Van Gossum, A. and K.N. Jeejeebhoy. Infected pancreatic pseudocyst and perioperative assessment, Chap. 9. In: Nutritional Medicine: A Case Management Approach, eds. G.L. Blackburn, S.J. Bell and J. Mullen. W.B. Saunders Co., Philadelphia, PA., pp. 56–64, 1989.
96. Whittaker, J.S. and K.N. Jeejeebhoy. Alimentation, Chap. 146. In: Endocrinology, 2nd ed., Vol. 3, eds. L.J. DeGroot, G.M. Besser, G.F. Cahill Jr., J.C. Marshall, D.H. Nelson, W.D. Odell, J.T. Potts Jr., A.H. Rubenstein and E. Steinberg. W.B. Saunders Co., Philadelphia, PA., pp. 2404–2423, 1989.
97. Jeejeebhoy, K.N. Nutrition in critical illness, Chap. 123. In: Textbook of Critical Care, 2nd ed., eds. W.C. Shoemaker, S. Ayres, A. Grenvik, P.R. Holbrook and W.L. Thompson. W.B. Saunders Co., Philadelphia, PA., pp. 1093–1118, 1989. (The Society of Critical Care Medicine, Fullerton, CA.)
98. Jeejeebhoy, K.N. Mechanism of reduction of total body potassium in malnutrition. In: In Vivo Body Composition Studies: Recent Advances, Basic Life Sciences, Vol. 55, eds. S. Yasumura, J.E. Harrison, K.G. McNeill, A.D. Woodhead and F.A. Dilmanian. Plenum Press, New York, N.Y., pp. 143–147, 1990. (Proceedings of the International Symposium on In Vivo Body Composition Studies, held 20–23 June 1989, at the University of Toronto, Toronto, ON., Canada.)
99. Jeejeebhoy, K.N. Assessment of nutritional status, Chap. 6. In: Clinical Nutrition: Enteral and Tube Feeding, 2nd ed., eds. J.L. Rombeau and M.D. Caldwell. W.B. Saunders Co., Philadelphia, PA., pp. 118–126, 1990.
100. Allard, J.P. and K.N. Jeejeebhoy. Nutrition in the critically ill. In: Current Therapy in Critical Care Medicine, 2nd ed., ed. J.E. Parrillo. B.C. Decker Inc., Hamilton, ON., Canada, pp. 262–271, 1991.
101. Pichard, C. and K.N. Jeejeebhoy. Metabolic consequences of total parenteral nutrition, Chap. 14. In: Nutritional Biochemistry and Metabolism: With Clinical Applications, 2nd ed., ed. M.C. Linder. Elsevier Science Publishing Co., New York, N.Y., pp. 425–448, 1991.
102. Jeejeebhoy, K.N. Nutritional aspects of inflammatory bowel disease, Chap. 24. In: Inflammatory Bowel Disease, eds. G. Jarnerot, J. Lennard-Jones and S. Truelove. Corona/Astra, Malmo, Sweden, pp. 471–498, 1992.
103. Jeejeebhoy, K.N. Muscle function and energetics. In: Metabolic Support of the Critically Ill Patient (Update in Intensive Care and Emergency Medicine, Vol. 17), eds. D.W. Wilmore and Y.A. Carpentier. Springer-Verlag, Berlin, Germany, pp. 46–62, 1993.
104. Jeejeebhoy, K.N. Nutrient requirements and nutrient deficiencies in gastrointestinal diseases, Chap. 101. In: Gastrointestinal Disease, 5th ed., Vol. 2, ed., eds. M.H. Sleisenger and J.S. Fordtran. W.B. Saunders Co., Philadelphia, PA., pp. 2017–2047, 1993.
105. Klein, S. and K.N. Jeejeebhoy. Long-term nutritional management of patients with maldigestion and malabsorption, Chap. 102. In: Gastrointestinal Disease, 5th ed., Vol. 2, ed., eds. M.H. Sleisenger and J.S. Fordtran. W.B. Saunders Co., Philadelphia, PA., pp. 2048–2062, 1993.
106. Pichard, C. and K.N. Jeejeebhoy. Nutritional management of clinical undernutrition, Chap. 29. In: Human Nutrition and Dietetics, 9th ed., eds. J.S. Garrow and W.P.J. James. Churchill Livingstone, Edinburgh, U.K., pp. 421–439, 1993.
107. Jeejeebhoy, K.N. Interaction of tumor necrosis factor/cachectin and nutrition. In: Yearbook of Intensive Care and Emergency Medicine, ed. J.-L. Vincent. Springer-Verlag, Berlin, Germany, pp. 197–211, 1993.
108. Jeejeebhoy, K.N. Metabolic effects of starvation, injury, illness, and sepsis. In: Nutrition in critical illness, Chap. 121. In: Textbook of Critical Care, 3rd ed., eds. S.M. Ayres, A. Grenvik, P.R. Holbrook and W.C. Shoemaker. W.B. Saunders Co., Philadelphia, PA., pp. 1106–1115, 1995.
109. Jeejeebhoy, K.N. Nutritional advice, Chap. 34. In: Inflammatory Bowel Disease:Basic Research, Clinical Implications, eds. L.R. Sutherland,Collins, Martin, McLeod, Targan, Wallace and Williams. Kluwer Academic Publishers, Lancaster, U.K. 1994.
110. Cheong, W. K. and K. N. Jeejeebhoy. Total-parenteral-nutrition induced essential and beneficial trace metal deficiencies, In: Handbook of Metal-Ligand Interactions in Biological Fluids, Vol. 1, Pt. 3. Chap. 5, Sect. B. G. Berthon. Merceal Dekker, Inc., New York, N.Y., pp. 523–525, 1995.
111. Jeejeebhoy, K.N. Sindromes do intestino curto e da alca cega (Short Bowel Syndrome and blind loop syndrome), chap. 51. In: Aparelho Digestivo-clinica e Cirurgia, 2A ed., Vol. 1, ed. J. Coelho. Medsi Editora Medica e Cientifica Ltda., Rio de Janeiro, Brazil, pp. 547–535, 1996.
112. Klein, S. and Jeejeebhoy, K.N. The Malnourished Patient: Nutritional Assessment and Management in gastrointestinal diseases, Chap. 16. In: Gastrointestinal Disease, 6th ed., Vol. 2, ed., eds. Mark Feldman, Bruce F. Scharnschmidt, M.H. Sleisenger. W.B. Saunders Co., Philadelphia, PA., pp. 235–253, 1997.
113. Jeejeebhoy, K.N. N. Normal Physiology: Nutrition. In Oxford textbook of critical care Eds AR Webb, MJ Shapiro, M Singer, PM Suter. Oxford University Press NY 379–382, 1999.
114. Jeejeebhoy, K.N. Carbohydrates and Muscle energetics. In Clinic et Metabolism. In Glucide, eds Messing B. and Bornet F. Institut Francaise pour la Nutrition, 1995.
115. Mary Keith and Jeejeebhoy, K.N. Immunonutrition. In Energy Metabolism in trauma. Little RA and Wernerman J Eds. Bailliere's Clinical Endocrinology and Metabolism. Bailliere Tindall London.11(4):709-738, 1998.
116. Jeejeebhoy, K.N. Micronutrient deficiencies. In Textbook of Critical Care 4th edition. Eds Shoemaker Et al. Section VI Endocrinology, metabolism, nutrition, pharmacology. 82:00-00, 1998.
117. Keith ME and Jeejeebhoy, K.N. Enteral Nutrition in wasting disorders. Curr Opin Gastroenterol 15:159-166,1999.
118. Jeejeebhoy, K.N. Print and Media Review. Encyclopedia of Human Nutrition. Edited by Michele Sandler, JJ Strain and Benjamin Caballero. 3 volume set. $925.00. Academic press, San Diego, California, 1998. ISBN 0-12-226694-3. Gastroenterology 117:1814-1815,1999
119. Jeejeebhoy, K.N. Nutrition versus drug therapy. Nestle Nutr Workshop Ser Clin Perform Programme. 2:139-49; 1999.
120. Jeejeebhoy, K.N. Micornutrients and Aging: review of recent evidence. Whitehall-Robins Report, Vol8 No. 3, 1999.
121. Jeejeebhoy, K.N. Insulin Resistance. Th Canadian Journal of CME 2000; June :29-32.
122. Jeejeebhoy, K.N. Using Beano in the treatment of flatulence caused by complex carbohydrate intolerance (CCI). The Canadian Journal of Diagnosis 17:58-62, 2000.
123. Jeejeebhoy, K.N. Body Function versus body structure in nutritional assessment. In Nutricion Clinica Bases Y Fundamentos, Ed Alberto Mijan de la Torre. Doyma, Scientific Medical Communications pp 41–61, 2000.
124. Jeejeebhoy, K.N. Nutrition in GI disease: Parenteral. In Evidenced Based Gastroenterology: A Framework for Clinical Practice. Eds Irvine EJ and Hunt RH. BC Decker Inc. Hamilton Canada. 2001.
125. Jeejeebhoy, K.N. Glucides er Energetique Musculaire In Dossier Scientifique del L’Institute Francais pour la Nutrition No. 11 ter Les Glucides Tome 3 partie VIII: Metabolism Chapitre V: 47–57,2001.
126. Jeejeebhoy, K.N. Enteral Feeding Current Opinion in Gastroenterology 2002;18:209-212
127. Jeejeebhoy, K.N. The effect of nutrition on mitochondria and its influence in the critically ill patient. In “Nutritional therapy in the critically ill patient” CD ROM Edited by Daniel Waitzberg 2003.
128. Keith, M and Jeejeebhoy, K.N. Chapter 2. Metabolic and Nutritional Assessment. In Textbook of Clinical Nutrition, edited by Michael J Gibney, Hester H Vorster, and Frans J Kok, Blackwell Science Ltd, Oxford, United Kingdom. 2004.
129. Jeejeebhoy, K.N. Parenteral and Enteral Nutrition. Section 4. Chapter XIII. In WebMD. Scientific American Publication, 2003.
130. Jeejeebhoy, K.N Nutritional Assessment. In Encyclopedia of Gastroenterology. pp 759–766. Academic Press 2004.
131. Jeejeebhoy, K.N. Enteral Feeding Current Opinion in Gastroenterology 2003; 19:140-143.
132. Jeejeebhoy, K.N. Nutritional Aspects of Congestive Heart Failure. Nutrition & the M.D. 2002; 28(11): 1–4.
133. Jeejeebhoy, K.N. Advances in Gastroenterology. Canadian Journal of Diagnosis October 2003.
134. Jeejeebhoy, K.N. Skeletal Muscle: Pathology, Diagnosis and Management of Disease,edited by Victor R Preedy and Timothy J Peters, 2002, 716 pages,hardcover, $199.00. Greenwich Medical Media, San Francisco. Am J Clin Nutrition. Book Review 2003.
135. Jeejeebhoy, K.N. Death by parenteral nutrition: Fact or Fiction. Editorial Nut Clin Prac. 2003; 18: 521 - 522.
136. Jeejeebhoy, K.N: Short Bowel Syndrome. In Intestinal Failure and Rehabilitation: A Clinical Guide. Eds Steiger E and Seidner D. pp 25–38. CRC press Boca Raton Florida 2005.
137. Jeejeebhoy, K.N Short Bowel Syndrome: In Modern Nutrition in Health and Disease 10th Edition. Ed Shils M. LippinCott Williams & Wilkins 2006.
138. Jeejeebhoy, K.N The Practical Nutritional Assessment. In Clinical Nutrition in Gastrointestinal Disease pp 3–10 Ed. Buchman A. Slack Inc. Thorofare NJ. 2006.
139. Chumlea, WC, Jeejeebhoy, K.N. Body Composition Analysis. In Clinical Nutrition in Gastrointestinal Disease pp 11–22 Ed. Buchman A. Slack Inc. Thorofare NJ. 2006.
140. Jeejeebhoy, K.N, Allard, J, Gramlich, l. Home Parenteral Nutrition in Canada. In Home Parenteral Nutrition eds Bozzetti F, Staun M, Van Gossum A. pp 36–42. CABI Cambridge MA 2006.
141. Jeejeebhoy, K.N. Short Bowel Syndrome. In 11th edition of Modern Nutrition in Health and Disease EDS. 2014.
142. Adjemian, Daniela, Jeejeebhoy, K.N, Allard, J.P. Home Parenteral Nutrition in Canada: An Update. 11 December 2014.
