= List of surgical procedures =

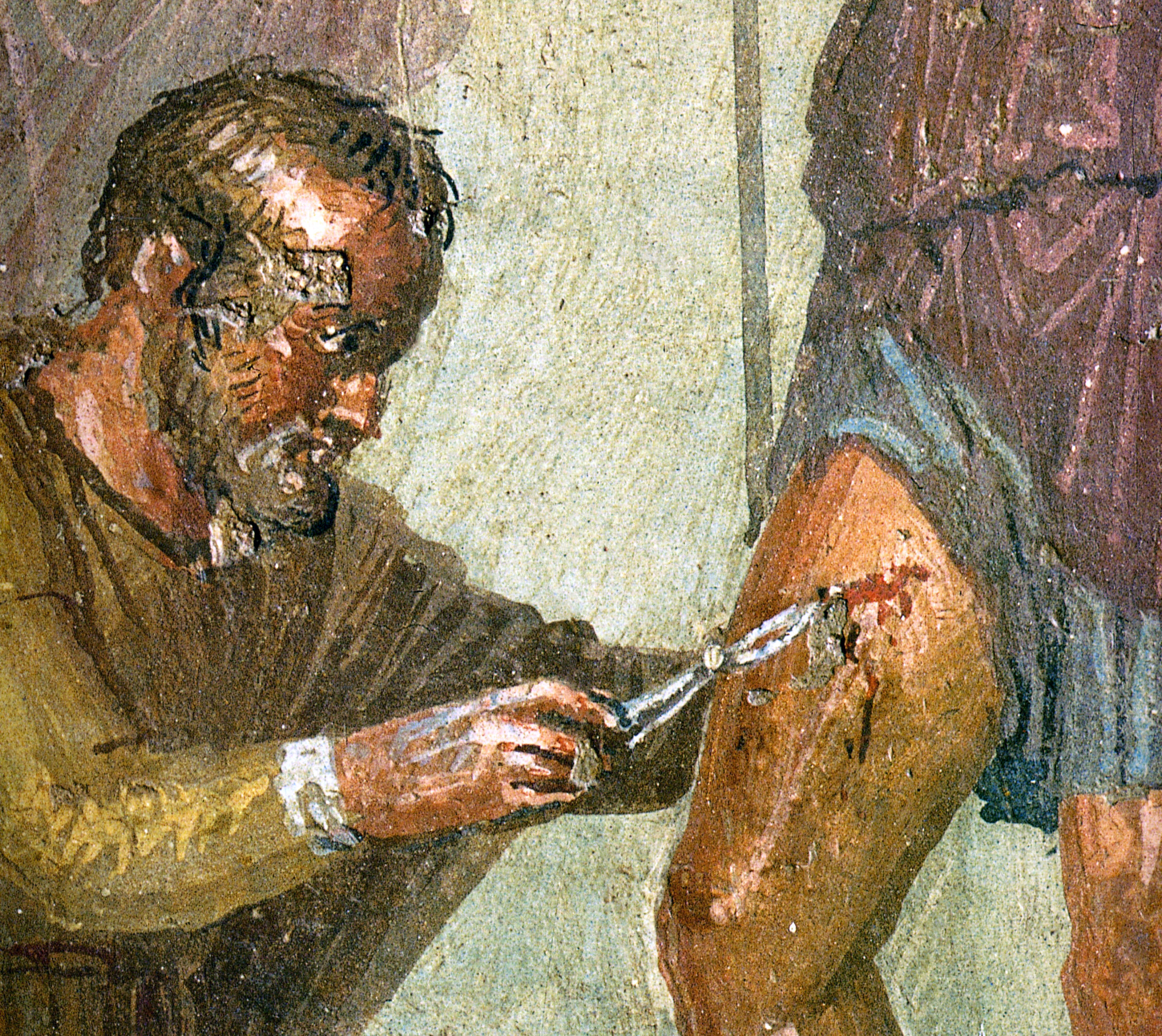
Iapyx removing an arrowhead from the thigh of Aeneas using forceps (Virgil Aeneid XII.383-440) Roman fresco from the Casa di Sirico in Pompeii. National Archaeological Museum, Naples

Many surgical procedure names can be broken into parts to indicate the meaning. For example, in gastrectomy, "ectomy" is a suffix meaning the removal of a part of the body. "Gastro-" means stomach. Thus, gastrectomy refers to the surgical removal of the stomach (or sections thereof). "Otomy" means cutting into a part of the body; a gastrotomy would be cutting into, but not necessarily removing, the stomach. In addition, "pharyngo" means pharynx, "laryngo" means larynx, and "esophag" means esophagus. Thus, "pharyngolaryngoesophagectomy" refers to the surgical removal of the three.

The field of minimally invasive surgery has spawned another set of words, such as arthroscopic or laparoscopic surgery. These take the same form as above; an arthroscope is a device which allows the inside of the joint to be seen.

== List of common surgery terms ==
=== Prefixes ===
- mono- : one, from the Greek μόνος, monos, "only, single"
- angio-: related to a blood vessel, from the Greek αγγήϊον angḗïon, "vessel", "container", "pot"
- arthr- : related to a joint, from the Greek άρθρον, árthron, "joint"
- bi- : two, from the Latin prefix *bi, meaning "two".
- colono- related to the large intestine colon, from the Latin cōlon, "clause [of a poem]", itself from the Greek κωλον, cōlon, "clause, member, part"
- colpo-: related to the vagina, from the Ancient Greek κόλπος, cólpos, meaning "hollow space", but also a synonym for "womb"
- cysto- : related to the bladder, from the Greek κύστις, cústis, "bladder, pouch"
- encephal- : related to the brain, from the Ancient Greek εγκέφαλος, enképhalos itself from εν, en, "in", and κεφαλή, kephalḗ, meaning 'head'.
- gastr- : related to stomach, from the Greek γαστήρ, gastḗr, "stomach"
- hepat- : related to the liver, from the Latin hēpatītis, from the latin hēpar, Greek loanword, originally ηπαρ, hēpar, meaning "liver"
- hyster- : related to the uterus, from Neo-Latin hysteria, itself ultimately from the Greek ύστέρα, hústéra, meaning "womb, uterus"
- lamino- : related to the lamina (posterior aspect of vertebra)
- lapar- : related to the abdominal cavity
  - Etymology actually refers to the soft, fleshy part of the abdominal wall. The term celio- is generally considered more accurate and more commonly used in America.
- lobo- : related to a lobe (of the brain or lungs), from the Latin lobus, itself from the Greek λοβός, lobós, "lobe", "pea-pod"
- mammo- and masto-: related to the breasts, from the Latin mammas, "breast", and Greek μάσταζ mástaz, "chewer"
- myo-: related to muscle tissue, from the Greek μυς, mús, from μύσκυλος múskulos, "little mouse", so called because the Greeks believed that muscles looked like little mice.
- nephro- : related to the kidney from the Greek νεφρόν, nephrón, accusative declension of νεφρός, kidney
- oophor- : related to the ovary, from ωοφόρος, oophóros, meaning "egg-bearing"
- orchid- related to the testicles, from the Latin orchis, itself from the Greek όρχις, órchis, meaning "testicle" or sometimes "orchid," so called because the Greeks believed orchid roots looked like testicles.
- rhino- : related to the nose, from the Greek ρινός rinós, genitive case of ρίς rís (indicating the stem), "nose"
- thoraco- : related to the chest (Greek θώραξ, thorax, a breastplate)
- vas- : related to a duct, usually the vas deferens, from the Latin vas, meaning "vessel", or "vein"

=== Suffixes ===
- -centesis : surgical puncture
- -tripsy : crushing or breaking up (τρῖψις, tripsis, rubbing)
- - desis : fusion of two parts into one, stabilization
- -ectomy : surgical removal (see List of -ectomies). The term 'resection' is also used, especially when referring to a tumor.
- -opsy : looking at
- -oscopy: viewing of, normally with a scope
- -ostomy or -stomy: surgically creating a hole (a new "mouth" or "stoma", from the Greek στόμα (stóma), meaning "mouth", see List of -ostomies)
- -otomy or -tomy : surgical incision (see List of -otomies); τόμος, tomos, a cut
- -pexy: to fix or secure
- -plasty: to modify or reshape (sometimes entails replacement with a prosthesis), from the Ancient Greek πλάστος, plástos, meaning "molded".
- -rrhaphy : to strengthen, usually with suture (ῤᾶφή, rhaphe, a seam or suture)

=== List of procedures ===
Category	Plasty	Ectomy	Stomy	Otomy	Other
Central nervous system	Cranioplasty · Laminoplasty	Decompressive craniectomy · Hemispherectomy · Discectomy · Anterior temporal lobectomy · Hypophysectomy · Amygdalohippocampectomy · Laminectomy	Ventriculostomy	Craniotomy · Cordotomy · Pallidotomy · Thalamotomy · Lobotomy · Bilateral cingulotomy · Cordotomy · Rhizotomy · Laminotomy · Foraminotomy	Neurosurgery · Psychosurgery · Brain biopsy · Meningeal biopsy · Trepanning · Epidural blood patch
Peripheral nervous system		Ganglionectomy · Sympathectomy/Endoscopic thoracic sympathectomy · Neurectomy		Axotomy · Vagotomy	Nerve biopsy
Endocrine		Hypophysectomy · Thyroidectomy · Parathyroidectomy · Adrenalectomy · Pinealectomy			Transsphenoidal surgery · Islet cell transplantation
Eye	Automated lamellar keratoplasty (ALK) · conductive keratoplasty (CK) · Laser thermal keratoplasty (LTK) · Blepharoplasty · Canaloplasty · Epicanthoplasty · Punctoplasty · Trabeculoplasty	Photorefractive keratectomy · Trabeculectomy · Refractive lensectomy · Iridectomy · Vitrectomy	Dacryocystorhinostomy · Conjunctivodacryocystorhinostomy	Radial keratotomy · Mini Asymmetric Radial Keratotomy (M.A.R.K.) · Iridotomy · Sclerotomy · Goniotomy · Trabeculotomy	Anterior chamber paracentesis · Cataract surgery · Corneal transplantation · Eye transplantation · Keratomileusis · Laser-assisted in situ keratomileusis (LASIK) · Laser-assisted sub-epithelium keratomileusis (LASEK) · Tarsorrhaphy · Small incision lenticule extraction · Limbal relaxing incisions (LRI) · Intrastromal corneal ring segments (Intacs) · Phakic intraocular lens (PIOL)
Ears	Otoplasty · Myringoplasty · Tympanoplasty	Stapedectomy · Mastoidectomy · Auriculectomy		Myringotomy	
Nose, mouth and larynx	Alarplasty · Rhinoplasty · Septoplasty · Cheiloplasty · Uvulopalatoplasty · Uvulopalatopharyngoplasty · Palatoplasty · Gingivoplasty · Alveoloplasty ·	Apicoectomy · Gingivectomy · Glossectomy · Rhinectomy · Laryngectomy · Adenoidectomy · Tonsillectomy · Lingual frenectomy · Labial frenectomy		Uvulotomy · Sinusotomy ·	Pharyngeal flap surgery
Respiratory		Pneumonectomy · Turbinectomy · Lung lobectomy · Needle thoracostomy · Hemilaryngectomy	Tracheostomy	Cricothyrotomy · Thoracotomy · Thyrotomy · Tracheotomy	Pleurodesis · Lung transplantation · Wedge resection · Decortication · Lung biopsy
Cardiovascular	Angioplasty · Valvuloplasty	Pericardiectomy · Endarterectomy		Cardiotomy · Pericardiotomy	Heart transplantation
Hemic and lymphatic		Thymectomy · Splenectomy · Lymphadenectomy			Thymus transplantation · Spleen transplantation · Splenopexy · Lymph node biopsy
Digestive system		Esophagectomy · Gastrectomy · Appendectomy · Proctocolectomy · Proctosigmoidectomy · Colectomy · Hepatectomy · Cholecystectomy · Pancreatectomy · Pancreaticoduodenectomy	Gastrostomy (Percutaneous endoscopic gastrostomy) · Gastroduodenostomy · Gastrojejunostomy · Gastroenterostomy · Ileostomy · Jejunostomy · Colostomy · Cholecystostomy · Choledochoduodenostomy · Cholecystenterostomy · Hepatoportoenterostomy ·	Myotomy (Heller myotomy · Pyloromyotomy) · Enterotomy · Choledocholithotomy · Anal sphincterotomy · Lateral internal sphincterotomy	Vertical banded gastroplasty · Gastropexy · Colon resection · Nissen fundoplication · Hernia repair · Omentopexy · Liver biopsy · Ileal interposition
Urinary	Urethroplasty · Pyeloplasty	Nephrectomy · Cystectomy	Nephrostomy · Ureterostomy · Cystostomy (Suprapubic cystostomy) · Urostomy	Nephrotomy	Nephropexy · Urethropexy · Lithotripsy · Kidney transplantation · Renal biopsy
Male reproductive	Phalloplasty · Scrotoplasty	Vasectomy · Penectomy · Orchidectomy · Prostatectomy · Posthectomy · Gonadectomy	Vasovasostomy · Vasoepididymostomy	Meatotomy	Circumcision · Foreskin restoration · Orchiopexy · Prostate biopsy
Female reproductive	Vaginoplasty · Vulvoplasty · Clitoroplasty · Labiaplasty · Tuboplasty · Fimbrioplasty	Cervicectomy · Clitoridectomy · Oophorectomy · Salpingo-oophorectomy · Salpingectomy · Hysterectomy · Vaginectomy · Vestibulectomy · Vulvectomy	Salpingostomy	Amniotomy · Clitoridotomy · Hysterotomy · Hymenotomy · Episiotomy · Symphysiotomy	Tubal ligation · Tubal reversal · Colporrhaphy · Cesarean section · Hymenorrhaphy · Endometrial biopsy
Bone, cartilage, and joint	bone: Acromioplasty · Kyphoplasty · Mentoplasty · Acromioplasty joint: Arthroplasty · Rotationplasty	bone: Ostectomy (Arytenoidectomy · Femoral head ostectomy · Vertebrectomy · Coccygectomy · Astragalectomy) · Corpectomy · Facetectomy · Laminectomy (Hemilaminectomy) joint: Synovectomy · Discectomy		bone: Osteotomy joint: Arthrotomy · Laminotomy · Foraminotomy	bone: Epiphysiodesis · Bone biopsy joint: Arthrodesis · Arthroscopy · Ulnar collateral ligament reconstruction
Muscle or soft tissue		Bursectomy · amputation (Hemicorporectomy, Hemipelvectomy)		Myotomy · Tenotomy · Fasciotomy	Muscle biopsy · Amputation · Tendon transfer
Breast	Mammoplasty	Lumpectomy · Mastectomy			Breast implant · Mastopexy · Breast reconstruction · Breast reduction plasty · Breast biopsy
Skin	V-plasty · VY-plasty · W-plasty · Z-plasty			Escharotomy	Skin biopsy
Other/ungrouped	Abdominoplasty · Hernioplasty · Frenuloplasty ·	Diverticulectomy · Frenectomy · Hemorrhoidectomy · Mastoidectomy · Thrombectomy · Embolectomy · Myomectomy · Panniculectomy	Ureterosigmoidostomy	Fistulotomy · Laparotomy · Sphincterotomy · Commissurotomy	Abdominal surgery · Inguinal hernia surgery · Biopsy · Bone marrow biopsy · Brostrom procedure · Cauterization · Grafting · Hypnosurgery · Laparoscopy · NOTES · Nuss procedure · Radiosurgery ·

== See also ==
- Cardiac surgery
- Surgical drain
- Endoscopy
- Fluorescence image-guided surgery
- Hypnosurgery
- Jet ventilation
- List of -ectomies
- List of -otomies
- List of -ostomies
- Category:Surgical procedures and techniques
