= List of -ectomies =

List of Surgical Removals

The surgical terminology suffix -ectomy was taken from Greek εκ-τομια = "act of cutting out". It means surgical removal of something, usually from inside the body.

== A ==
- Adenectomy is the surgical removal of a gland.
- Adenoidectomy is the surgical removal of the adenoids, also known as the pharyngeal tonsils.
- Adrenalectomy is the removal of one or both adrenal glands.
- Aneurysmectomy is the resection or removal of an aneurysm.
- Apicoectomy is the surgical removal of tooth's root tip.
- Appendectomy is the surgical removal of the appendix; it is also known as an appendicectomy.
- Arthrectomy is the removal of a joint of the body.
- Atherectomy is a removal of atherosclerosis.
- Auriculectomy is the removal of the ear.

== B ==
- Bullectomy is the surgical removal of bullae from the lung.
- Bunionectomy is the removal of a bunion.
- Bursectomy is the removal of a bursa, a small sac filled with synovial fluid.

== C ==
- Cardiectomy is the removal of the cardia of the stomach.
- Cecectomy is the removal of the cecum.
- Cephalectomy is the surgical removal of the head (decapitation).
- Cervicectomy is the removal of the cervix.
- Cholecystectomy is the surgical removal of the gallbladder.
- Clitoridectomy is the partial or total removal of the external part of the clitoris.
- Colectomy is the removal of the colon.
- Craniectomy is the surgical removal of a portion of the cranium.
- Cystectomy is the removal of the urinary bladder. It also means removal of a cyst.
- Corpectomy is the removal of a vertebral body as well as the adjacent inter-vertebral discs.

== D ==
- Discectomy is a surgical procedure involving the dissection of an extravasted segment of the intervertebral disc.
- Diverticulectomy is a surgical procedure to remove a diverticulum.
- Duodenectomy is the removal of the duodenum.

== E ==
- Embolectomy is the removal of any type of embolism.
- Encephalectomy is the removal of the brain.
- Endarterectomy is the removal of plaque from the lining of the artery otherwise constricted by a buildup of fatty deposits.
- Endoscopic thoracic sympathectomy is the burning, severing, removing or clamping parts of the sympathetic nerve trunk.
- Esophagectomy is the surgical removal of all or part of the esophagus.
- Extrapleural pneumonectomy is the removal of the entire lung along with the pleura, the lung lining and part of the pericardium, the lining of the heart.

== F ==
- Frenectomy is the removal of a frenulum.
- Fundectomy is the removal of the fundus of an organ, such as the uterus or the stomach.

== G ==
- Ganglionectomy is the excision of a ganglion.
- Gastrectomy is the partial or full removal of the stomach.
- Gingivectomy is the removal of gums.
- Glossectomy is the removal of part or all of the tongue.
- Gonadectomy is the removal of the gonads.

== H ==
- Hemicolectomy is the removal of half the colon or the large intestine.
- Hemicorporectomy is the surgical amputation of the entire body below the waist, including the legs, genitalia, urinary system, pelvic bones, anus, and rectum.
- Hemilaminectomy is the surgical trimming or partial removal of the lamina portion of a spinal vertebra.
- Hemipelvectomy is the surgical removal of half of the pelvis and one of the legs. There are two types of the operation, first being an internal hemipelvectomy in which the pelvis on the one side is removed but the leg is saved. The second type of operation being an external hemipelvectomy, which removes the pelvis on the one side along with the amputation of that leg.
- Hemispherectomy is the surgical removal of one cerebral hemisphere.
- Hemorrhoidectomy is removal of a hemorrhoid.
- Hepatectomy is the surgical resection of the liver.
- Hypophysectomy is the surgical removal of the pituitary gland or hypophysis such as when presented with a tumor.
- Hysterectomy is the surgical removal of the uterus.

== I ==
- Iridectomy is the removal of a piece of iris from the eye (mainly done for iris tumours, such as melanoma of the iris).

== J ==
- Jejunectomy is the surgical removal of all or part of the jejunum.

== K ==
- Keratectomy is the surgical removal of the cornea of the eye.
- Kyphectomy is a specific surgery on the spine.

== L ==
- Laminectomy is the trimming or surgical removal of the lamina, portion of the spinal vertebrae.
- Laryngectomy is the surgical removal of the larynx, which involves separating the airway from the mouth, nose and esophagus.
- Lobectomy is the removal of a lobe.
- Lumpectomy is the surgical removal of a lump from a breast.
- Lymphadenectomy consists of the surgical removal of one or more groups of lymph nodes.

== M ==
- Mandibulectomy is the removal of the mandible or the lower jaw bone.
- Mastectomy is the surgical removal of one or both breasts. A mastectomy can be either partial or complete.
- Mastoidectomy is the removal of mastoid process.
- Maxillectomy is the removal of the maxilla or cheekbone. This can sometimes be done with orbital exenteration (removal of the eye and the orbital contents surrounding the eye) or by enucleation (removal of the eyeball).
- Meniscectomy surgical removal of all or part of a torn meniscus, which is a common knee joint injury. Partial meniscectomy is preferred by surgeons over total meniscectomy.
- Mucosectomy is the removal of a mucosa.
- Myectomy is the removal of a portion of muscle.
- Matrixectomy is the removal of a toenail.
- Myomectomy is the removal of fibroids from the uterus, but the uterus is left intact.

== N ==
- Necrosectomy is the removal of dead tissue.
- Nephrectomy is the removal of a kidney.
- Neurectomy is the removal of a nerve.

== O ==
- Oophorectomy is the surgical removal of the ovaries, also called spaying.
- Orchiectomy is the surgical removal of the testicles, also called orchidectomy, castration, or neutering.
- Ostectomy is the surgical removal of bone.
- Operculectomy is the surgical removal of the gum flaps that cover erupted wisdom teeth.

== P ==
- Pancreatectomy is the removal of part or all of the pancreas. If the whole of the pancreas is removed, the person will become diabetic.
- Pancreaticoduodenectomy is the surgical removal involving the pancreas and the duodenum.
- Panniculectomy is the removal of a panniculus, which is a dense layer of fatty tissue growth consisting of subcutaneous fat in the lower abdominal area.
- Parathyroidectomy is the surgical removal of one or more of the parathyroid glands.
- Penectomy is the partial or complete removal of the penis. Also known as a pendectomy.
- Pericardiectomy is the partial or complete removal of the pericardial sac around the heart.
- Pharyngectomy is the removal of the pharynx (also called the throat).
- Pharyngolaryngoesophagectomy is the surgical removal of the pharynx, larynx and esophagus, usually as a result of cancer of the hypopharynx.
- Photorefractive keratectomy is the alteration of the cornea by means of a laser.
- Pinealectomy is the surgical removal of the pineal gland, used often on birds to study circadian rhythms.
- Pneumonectomy is the surgical removal of a lung.
- Polypectomy is the surgical removal of an abnormal growth of tissue known as a polyp.
- Posthectomy, more commonly known as circumcision, is the surgical removal of the foreskin of the penis. This is also known as a prepucectomy, as the medical term for the foreskin is the prepuce.
- Proctocolectomy is the removal of the colon or the large intestine and the rectum.
- Prostatectomy is the removal of the prostate gland. This may be either all of the gland, which is known as a radical prostatectomy, or just a part of the prostate, which is called a transurethral resection of the prostate.
- Pulpectomy is the removal of all the material in the pulp chamber and root canal of a tooth.

== Q ==
- Quadrantectomy is a surgical procedure in which quadrant (approximately one-fourth) of the breast, including tissue surrounding a cancerous tumor, is removed.

== R ==
- Rhinectomy is the removal of part or all of the nose.

== S ==
- Salpingectomy is the removal of the fallopian tubes.
- Salpingo-oophorectomy is the removal of the ovary and the fallopian tube together, when both left and right tubes and ovaries are removed, this is referred to as a bilateral salpingo-oophorectomy.
- Scaphoidectomy is the removal of the scaphoid bone.
- Septectomy is the removal of a septum.
- Splenectomy is the surgical removal of the spleen. Autosplenectomy is where certain diseases destroy the spleen's function.
- Stapedectomy is the removal of ossified stapes from the ear that are then replaced by a prosthesis.
- Sympathectomy is the cutting of the nerves.
- Synovectomy is the removal of the synovial membrane of a synovial joint.

== T ==
- Thrombectomy is the removal of thrombi (blood clots).
- Thymectomy is the surgical removal of the thymus gland.
- Thyroidectomy is the removal of all or part of the thyroid gland.
- Tonsillectomy is the removal of the tonsils.
- Trabeculectomy is the removal of part of the eye's trabecular meshwork as a treatment for glaucoma.
- Tumorectomy is the surgical removal of a tumor.
- Turbinectomy is the removal of the turbinate bones in the nasal passage.
- Tympanectomy is the removal of the eardrum.
- Tubectomy in this, a small part of the fallopian tube/oviduct/uterine tube/salpinx is removed or tied up through a small incision in the abdomen or through vagina/birth canal.

== U ==
- Uretectomy is the removal of the ureter.
- Uvulectomy is the removal of the uvula.

== V ==
- Vaginectomy is the removal of all or part of the vagina.
- Vasectomy is the surgical occlusion of the vas deferens, tubes that connect to the male testes and transport sperm, a procedure for the purposes of sterilization in males.
- Vesiculectomy is the removal of all or part of the seminal vesicle.
- Vitrectomy is the removal of some or all of the vitreous humor from the eye.
- Vulvectomy is the removal of all or part of the vulva.

== Other uses ==
Sometimes this suffix is used humorously in non-surgical contexts, for example "popculturectomy" for a type of editing process on a text.

== See also ==
- List of surgical procedures
- List of -otomies
- List of -ostomies
