= List of -ostomies =

This is a list of surgeries and surgical procedures that are -ostomy or -stomy : surgically creating a hole (a new "mouth" or "stoma")

== Gastrointestinal ==
- Gastrostomy
  - Percutaneous endoscopic gastrostomy
- Gastroduodenostomy
- Gastrojejunostomy
- Gastroenterostomy
- Ileostomy
- Jejunostomy
- Colostomy
- Cholecystostomy
- Cholecystenterostomy
- Choledochoduodenostomy
- Hepatoportoenterostomy
- Cecostomy

== Urogenital ==
- Hysterostomy
- Nephrostomy
- Ureterosigmoidostomy
- Ureterostomy
- Cystostomy
  - Suprapubic cystostomy
- Urostomy

== Nervous system ==
- Ventriculostomy

== Respiratory System ==
- Tracheostomy

=== Nose ===
- Dacryocystorhinostomy

== See also ==
- Surgery
- List of surgical procedures
- List of -ectomies
- List of -otomies
