= Sphincterotomy =

Sphincterotomy may refer to:

- Anal sphincterotomy
- Biliary endoscopic sphincterotomy
- Lateral internal sphincterotomy

== See also ==
- Sphincter
