= List of -otomies =

All surgical procedures in which something is cut or separated

The suffix '-otomy' is derived from Greek τόμος (-tómos) 'cutting, sharp, separate'.

== Medical procedures ==
- Amniotomy – An incision created to accelerate labor.
- Androtomy – Dissection of the human body.
- Bilateral cingulotomy – Psychosurgery, treatment for depression and addiction .
- Bronchotomy – A procedure that ensures there is an open airway between a patient's lung/s and the outside world.
- Clitoridotomy – Plastic surgery of the clitorial hood.
- Coeliotomy – A large incision through the abdominal wall to gain access into the abdominal cavity
- Colpotomy – Extraction of fluid from the rectouterine pouch through a needle.
- Cordotomy – Procedure that disables selected pain-conducting tracts in the spinal cord, in order to achieve loss of pain and temperature perception.
- Craniotomy – A bone flap is temporarily removed from the skull to access the brain.
- Cricothyrotomy – An incision made through the skin and cricothyroid membrane to establish a patent airway during certain life-threatening situations.
- Escharotomy – Procedure used to treat full-thickness (third-degree) circumferential burns.
- Episiotomy – Surgical incision of the perineum and the posterior vaginal wall.
- Fasciotomy – Surgical procedure where the fascia is cut to relieve tension or pressure commonly to treat the resulting loss of circulation to an area of tissue or muscle.
- Heller myotomy – Muscles of the cardia (lower oesophageal sphincter or LOS) are cut, allowing food and liquids to pass to the stomach.
- Hymenotomy – Surgical removal or opening of the hymen.
- Hysterotomy – Incision in the uterus, and is performed during a Caesarean section.
- Laminotomy – The partial removal (or by making a larger opening) of the lamina.
- Laparotomy – Large incision through the abdominal wall to gain access into the abdominal cavity.
- Lithotomy position – Medical term referring to a common position for surgical procedures and medical examinations involving the pelvis and lower abdomen.
- Lobotomy – Cutting or scraping away most of the connections to and from the prefrontal cortex, the anterior part of the frontal lobes of the brain.
- Meatotomy – Form of penile modification in which the underside of the glans is split.
- Myotomy – Procedure in which muscle is cut.
- Osteotomy – A bone is cut to shorten or lengthen it or to change its alignment.
- Phlebotomy – An incision in a vein with a needle.
- Pulpotomy – Removal of a portion of the pulp, including the diseased aspect.
- Radial keratotomy – A refractive surgical procedure to correct myopia.
- Sphincterotomy – Treating mucosal fissures from the anal canal/sphincter.
- Thoracotomy – Incision into the pleural space of the chest.
- Thyrotomy – Incision of the larynx through the thyroid cartilage.
- Tracheotomy – An incision on the anterior aspect of the neck and opening a direct airway through an incision in the trachea (windpipe).
- Trans-orbital lobotomy – Cutting or scraping away most of the connections to and from the prefrontal cortex, the anterior part of the frontal lobes of the brain.

== Other -otomies ==
- Dichotomy
- False dichotomy
- Ousterhout's dichotomy
- Trichotomy
- Trichotomy property

== See also ==
- List of surgical procedures
- List of -ectomies
- List of -ostomies
