= Adenectomy =

Surgical removal of all or part of a gland

Adenectomy (from Greek aden 'gland' and ektomē 'to remove') is a surgical removal of all or part of a gland.

== See also ==
- List of surgeries by type
