= Keratotomy =

Keratotomy is a type of refractive surgical procedure and can refer to:

- Radial keratotomy
- Photorefractive keratotomy

== See also ==
- List of -otomies
