= Otomi (disambiguation) =

Otomi may refer to:

- Otomi people, an indigenous people of Mexico
- Otomi language, the language of the Otomi people
- Otomi (military), an Aztec military order

== See also ==
- Otomys, rat genus
- List of -otomies, family of surgical procedures
