= Scoliosis and Spinal Disorders =

- Discipline: Spinal medicine
- Language: English
- Edited by: Theodoros B. Grivas Dino Samartzis

Publication details
- History: Founded 2006
- Publisher: BioMed Central (UK)
- Open access: Full

Standard abbreviations
- ISO 4: Scoliosis Spinal Disord.

Indexing
- ISSN: 2397-1789

Links
- Journal homepage

Scoliosis and Spinal Disorders (ISSN 2397-1789) is an international, multidisciplinary open-access, peer-reviewed, online-only medical journal addressing all spine conditions. The journal encompasses all aspects of research on prevention, diagnosis, treatment, outcomes and cost-analyses of conservative and surgical management of all spinal deformities, disorders and conditions (e.g. low back pain, degenerative disc disease, trauma, etc.). Both clinical and basic science reports form the cornerstone of the journal in its endeavor to provide original, primary studies as well as narrative/systematic reviews and meta-analyses to the academic community and beyond. The journal aims to provide an integrated and balanced view of spine research to further enhance effective collaboration among clinical spine specialists and scientists, and to ultimately improve patient outcomes based on an evidence-based spine care approach.

Published by BioMed Central, Scoliosis and Spinal Disorders is the official journal of the Society on Scoliosis Orthopaedic and Rehabilitation Treatment (SOSORT) and is also affiliated with the International Research Society of Spinal Deformities (IRSSD), Hellenic Spine Society (HSS), Italian Scoliosis and Spine Study Group (GSS), Italian Physiotherapist Association (AIFI), Study in Multidisciplinary Pain Research (SIMPAR), Chinese Orthopaedic Research Society (CORS), and the International Spine and Pain Consortium (ISPC).

The journal was initially started in 2006 and was called "Scoliosis". In 2016, the journal changed its name to Scoliosis and Spinal Disorders, and extended its scope to include all spine-related issues and themes. The journal is currently indexed in PubMed, Scopus and dozens of other search engines. Its editorial board is composed of spine experts located throughout the globe.

As of 2016, the Editors-in-Chief are Theodoros B. Grivas from the Department of Traumatology and Orthopaedics at Tzaneio General Hospital in Piraeus, Greece and Dino Samartzis from the Department of Orthopaedics and Traumatology, The University of Hong Kong in Hong Kong.
