= Commando Operation =

- Specialty: Oncology, maxillofacial surgery, otolaryngology

The COMMANDO Operation or COMMANDO Procedure (COMbined MAndibulectomy and Neck Dissection Operation) is a complicated operation for 1st degree malignancy of the tongue. It comprises glossectomy (total removal of the tongue) and hemimandibulectomy together with block dissection of the cervical nodes. The operation is so named because of its extensive nature.
