= Astragalectomy =

- Subtalar joint
- Other names: Talectomy
- Specialty: Orthopedic

Astragalectomy, sometimes called a talectomy, is a surgical operation for removal of the talus bone (astragalus) for stabilization of the ankle.

Historically, an astragalectomy was used in cases of severe ankle trauma and congenial talipes equinovarus (clubfoot). It is no longer a common operation, but is still used in cases of a deformed calcaneus, foot paralysis following poliomyelitis, and rigid clubfoot deformities that are secondary to spina bifida or arthrogryposis (AMC). The surgery is also performed in severe cases of pulverized or infected open fractures.

Generally, the surgical procedure involves making an anterolateral incision, stripping the ligaments from both malleoli and the calcaneus so that the foot can be displaced posteriorly. The talus is then resected, and the foot is placed so that the lateral malleolus rests opposite the calcaneocuboid joint, and the medial malleolus lies just above and behind the navicular bone. The foot is held in place with a surgical pin or with Kirschner wire. After the operation, the patient wears an above-knee cast for six weeks, followed by a below-knee cast for eighteen weeks.

== See also ==
- List of surgeries by type
