= Nephrotomy =

- ICD-9-CM: 55.01

Nephrotomy describes a surgical procedure in which an incision in the kidney is made.

== See also ==
- List of surgeries by type
