= Hemicorporectomy =

Amputation of the body below the waist

- Pronunciation: /ˌhɛmiˌkɔːrpəˈrɛktəmi/
- Other names: Translumbar amputation, corporal transection, hemisomato-tmesis, halfectomy
- ICD-10-PCS: S38.3
- MeSH: D006428

Hemicorporectomy is a radical surgery in which the body below the waist is amputated, transecting the lumbar spine. This removes the legs, the genitalia (internal and external), urinary system, pelvic bones, anus, and rectum. It is a major procedure recommended only as a last resort for people with severe and potentially fatal illnesses such as osteomyelitis, tumors, severe traumas and intractable decubiti in, or around, the pelvis. As of 2025, 79 cases have been reported in medical literature.

== Medical uses ==
The operation is performed to treat spreading cancers of the spinal cord and pelvic bones. Other reasons may include trauma affecting the pelvic girdle ("open-book fracture"), uncontrollable abscess or ulcers of the pelvic region (causing sepsis) or other locally uncontainable conditions. It is used in cases wherein even pelvic exenteration would not remove sufficient tissue.

== Procedure ==
The surgical procedure is typically done in two stages, but it is possible to conduct the surgery in one stage. The first stage is the discontinuation of the waste functions by performing a colostomy and ileal conduit in the upper abdominal quadrants. The second stage is the amputation at the lumbar spine.

== Considerations ==
With the removal of almost half of the circulatory system, cardiac function needs to be closely monitored while a new blood pressure set-point develops.

Removal of large parts of the colon can lead to loss of electrolytes. Similarly, calculated measurements of renal function (such as the Cockcroft-Gault formula) are unlikely to reflect actual activity of the kidney, as these calculations were developed for patients in whom the circulatory system correlates with the body weight; this relation is lost in a post-hemicorporectomy patient.

== Rehabilitation ==
Extensive physiotherapy and occupational therapy is necessary after the procedure. A return to mobility generally involves the use of a wheelchair and potentially a prosthetic. Designing a prosthesis for the removed body parts is difficult, as there is generally no remaining pelvic girdle musculature (unless this has been spared expressly).

== Traumatic hemicorporectomy ==
Individuals sustaining a severe bisection injury that is essentially a de facto hemicorporectomy rarely reach a hospital before dying. Apart from the very low likelihood of surviving such an injury, even an operative hemicorporectomy is unlikely to be successful unless the patient has "sufficient emotional and psychological maturity to cope" and "sufficient determination and physical strength to undergo the intensive rehabilitation".

Emergency rooms and ambulance service policies advise against the resuscitation of such patients. The UK's National Health Service, for example, in its "Policy and Procedures for the Recognition of Life Extinct" describes traumatic hemicorporectomy (along with decapitation) as "unequivocally associated with death" and that such injuries should be considered "incompatible with life" in patients under 18. The National Association of EMS Physicians (NAEMSP) and the American College of Surgeons Committee on Trauma (COT) have also released similar position statements and policy allowing on-scene personnel to determine if patients are to be considered unresuscitatable.

In one case documented by the Archives of Emergency Medicine in 1989, a woman who sustained a complete corporal transection (hemicorporectomy) after being struck by a train during an attempted suicide arrived at a hospital in a "fully conscious" state and "was aware of the nature of her injury and wished for further treatment". Although the patient was initially stabilized and underwent three hours of emergency surgery, she died approximately two hours later due to "hypovolemia, cardiac arrhythmia and biochemical imbalance".

== Prosthesis ==
Following a hemicorporectomy, patients are fitted with a socket-type prosthesis often referred to as a bucket. Early bucket designs often presented significant pressure problems for patients, but new devices have incorporated an inflatable rubber lining composed of air pockets that evenly distributes pressure based on the patient's motions. Two openings at the front of the bucket create space for the colostomy bag and the ileal conduit.

== History ==
The development of surgical medicine was vastly accelerated during, and following, the Second World War. Rarely-experienced traumas were made more common by new weaponry. This required decisive surgical action as well as the development of new techniques. As B. E. Ferrara stated in his summative article on hemicorporectomy,

Lessons learned from battlefield injuries quickened innovative treatment of congenital and acquired conditions ... [the general surgeon] devised extensive cancer operations including extended radical mastectomy, radical gastrectomy and pancreatectomy, pelvic exenteration, the 'Commando Operation' (tongue, jaw and neck dissection), bilateral back dissection, hemipelvectomy, and then hemicorporectomy or translumbar amputation, referred to as the most revolutionary of all operative procedures.

It was into this environment that Frederick E. Kredel first proposed the operation in February 1951 while discussing a paper on pelvic exenteration.

By 2019, 66 cases had been reported in medical literature.

== List of people with hemicorporectomy ==
- Tammy Reed, who was known as Angel, had a hemicorporectomy in 2010. Angel was a paraplegic and without the surgery, chronic sores and infection would have killed her within 18 months. Angel died on 25 March 2019.
- Army Sgt. Joseph Grabianowski had a hemicorporectomy in 2012 after a road side bomb and a buried explosive severely injured him in Afghanistan.
- Loren Schauers, an American man, had a hemicorporectomy in 2019 after a traumatic forklift accident. Loren and his wife Sabia have a YouTube channel where they document Loren's new lifestyle without half of his body.

== See also ==
- Amputation
- Black Dahlia
- Death by sawing
- The Godwhale, a science fiction novel featuring a protagonist who has undergone this procedure
- Waist chop, a form of execution used in China until 1734
- Sawing a woman in half
- Teke Teke, a Japanese urban legend about a girl who is said to have fallen on a railroad line and had her body cut in half
- Manananggal, a Filipino mythical creature that separates their lower body and has a vampire-like appearance.
