= Arthrotomy =

Surgical procedure of creating an opening in a joint

- ICD-9-CM: 80.0-80.1

In surgery, an arthrotomy is the creation of an opening in a joint that may be used in drainage.

== See also ==
- List of surgeries by type
