= Sinusotomy =

- ICD-9-CM: 22.50

A sinusotomy is a surgical operation in which an incision is made in a sinus to prevent or reduce inflammation. The first sinusotomy was performed in 1962 by Kraznov.

== See also ==
- List of surgeries by type
