= Cardiotomy =

Surgical procedure

- ICD-10-PCS: ICD9 = 37.11

A cardiotomy is a surgical procedure where an incision is made in the heart. It can be used for suction during heart surgery.

== See also ==
- List of surgeries by type
