= Sphincter =

Circular muscle around a body passage or orifice

Identifiers
- TA98: A04.0.00.028
- TA2: 1992
- FMA: 75004

A sphincter is a circular muscle that normally maintains constriction of a natural body passage or orifice and relaxes as required by normal physiological functioning. Sphincters are found in many animals. There are over 60 types in the human body, some microscopically small, in particular the millions of precapillary sphincters. Sphincters relax at death, often releasing fluids and feces.

== Functioning ==
Each sphincter is associated with the lumen (opening) it surrounds. As long as the sphincter muscle is contracted, its length is shortened and the lumen is constricted (closed). Relaxation of the muscle causes it to lengthen, opening the lumen and allowing the passage of liquids, solids, or gases.

This is evident, for example, in the blowholes of numerous marine mammals.

Many sphincters are used every day in the normal course of digestion. For example, the lower esophageal sphincter (or cardiac sphincter), which resides at the top of the stomach, is closed most of the time, keeping acids and other stomach contents from pushing up and into the oesophagus, but opens to let swallowed food pass into the stomach.

== Classifications ==
Sphincters can be further classified into functional and anatomical sphincters:

- Anatomical sphincters have a localised and often circular muscle thickening to facilitate their action as a sphincter.
- Functional sphincters do not have this localised muscle thickening and achieve their sphincteric action through muscle contraction around (extrinsic) or within (intrinsic) the structure.

Sphincters can also be voluntarily or involuntarily controlled:

- Voluntary sphincters are supplied by somatic nerves.
- Involuntary sphincters are stimulated by autonomic nerves.

== Examples ==
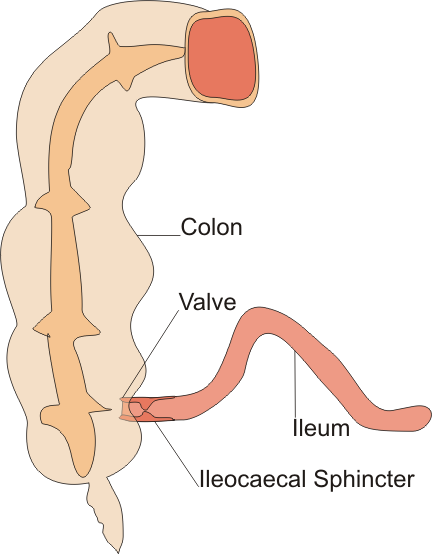
Diagram of ileocaecal valve and sphincter

- The pupillary sphincter, belonging to the iris in the eye.
- The orbicularis oculi muscle, a sphincter-like muscle around the eye.
- The upper oesophageal sphincter
- The lower esophageal sphincter, or cardiac sphincter, at the upper portion (cardia) of the stomach. This sphincter prevents the acidic contents of the stomach from moving upward into the esophagus.
- The pyloric sphincter, at the lower end of the stomach.
- The ileocecal sphincter at the junction of the small intestine (ileum) and the large intestine, which functions to limit the reflux of colonic contents back into the ileum.
- The sphincter of Oddi, or Glisson's sphincter, controlling secretions from the liver, pancreas and gall bladder into the duodenum.
- The urethral sphincters, controlling the exit of urine from the body.
- At the anus, there are two anal sphincters which control the exit of feces from the body, the internal anal sphincter and external anal sphincter. The inner sphincter is involuntary and the outer is voluntary.
- The microscopic precapillary sphincters function to control the blood flow into each capillary in response to local metabolic activity.
- The orbicularis oris muscle, (not a true sphincter) a complex of muscles in the lips that encircles the mouth.

== Clinical significance ==
There are surgeries called sphincterotomies that cut a sphincter muscle for the relief of different conditions. Some of these are the lateral internal sphincterotomy and anal sphincterotomy to treat anal fissures, and the biliary endoscopic sphincterotomy to treat some digestive conditions including the removal of bile stones.
