= Iridectomy =

Surgical removal of part of the iris

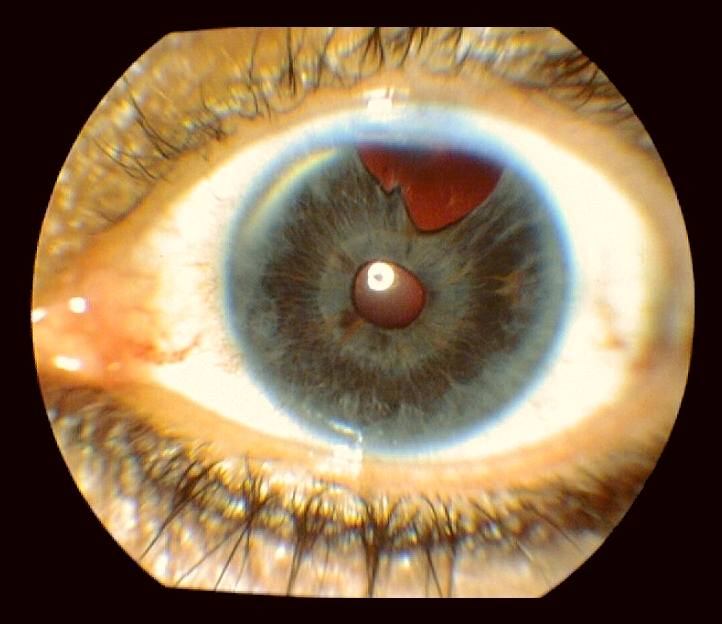
- Large peripheral iridectomy deforms pupil
- Other names: Surgical iridectomy
- ICD-9-CM: 12.1
- MeSH: D032801

An iridectomy, also known as a surgical iridectomy or corectomy, is the surgical removal of part of the iris. These procedures are most frequently performed in the treatment of closed-angle glaucoma and iris melanoma.

== Comparison with Nd:YAG laser iridotomy ==
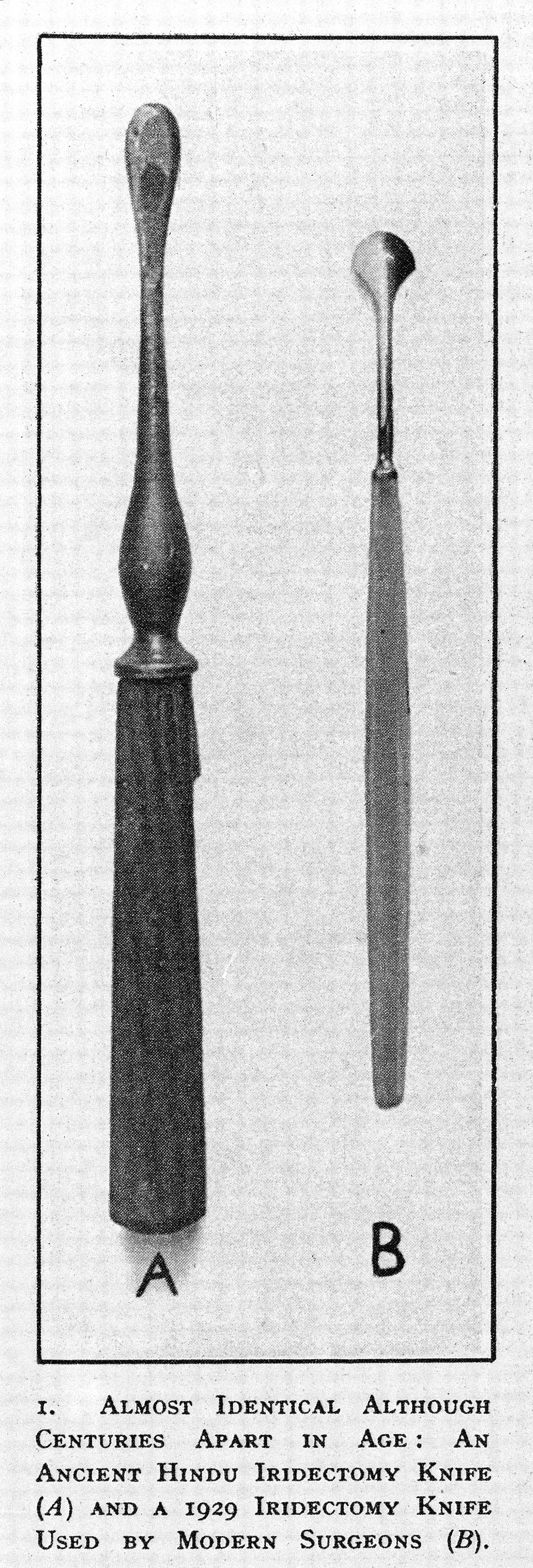
Ancient Hindu and modern iridectomy knives

In acute angle-closure glaucoma cases, surgical iridectomy has been superseded by Nd:YAG laser iridotomy, because the laser procedure is much safer. Opening the globe for a surgical iridectomy in a patient with high intraocular pressure greatly increases the risk of suprachoroidal hemorrhage, with potential for associated expulsive hemorrhage. Nd:YAG laser iridotomy avoids such a catastrophe by using a laser to create a hole in the iris, which facilitates flow of aqueous humor from the posterior to the anterior chamber of the eye.

== Current indications ==
Surgical iridectomy is commonly indicated and performed in the following cases:

- Cataract surgery in a glaucoma patient
- Combined procedure for cataract and glaucoma
- Acute closed-angle glaucoma
- Posterior capsular tears with vitreous loss
- Implantation of anterior chamber IOL.
- Vitreoretinal procedure involving injection of silicone oil. The location of the iridectomy in such cases is at 6 o'clock, as opposed to routine iridectomy done at 11 to 1 o'clock. This is because silicone oil is less dense than water.
- Iris trauma

== Types ==
- An antiphogistic iridectomy is the surgical removal of part of the iris to reduce intraocular pressure in inflammatory conditions of the eye.
- A basal iridectomy is an iridectomy which includes the root of the iris.
- An optical iridectomy is the surgical removal of part of the iris to enlarge the existing pupil, or to form an artificial pupil, when the natural pupil is ineffectual.
- A peripheral iridectomy is the surgical removal of a portion of the iris in the region of its root, leaving the pupillary margin and sphincter pupillae muscle intact. It is used in the treatment of glaucoma.
- A preliminary iridectomy, or preparatory iridectomy, is the surgical removal of part of the iris preceding cataract extraction. It facilitates the removal of the cataractous lens.
- A sector iridectomy, also known as a complete iridectomy or total iridectomy, is the surgical removal of a complete radial section of the iris extending from the pupillary margin to the root of the iris. A key-hole pupil is left by the removal of a wedge-shaped section of iris.
- A stenopeic iridectomy is the surgical removal of a narrow slit or a minute portion of the iris, leaving the sphincter pupillae muscle intact.
- A therapeutic iridectomy is the surgical removal of a portion of the iris for the cure or prevention of an ocular disease.

== See also ==
- Eye surgery
- Glaucoma surgery
- List of surgeries by type
