= Proctocolectomy =

Surgical removal of the colon and rectum

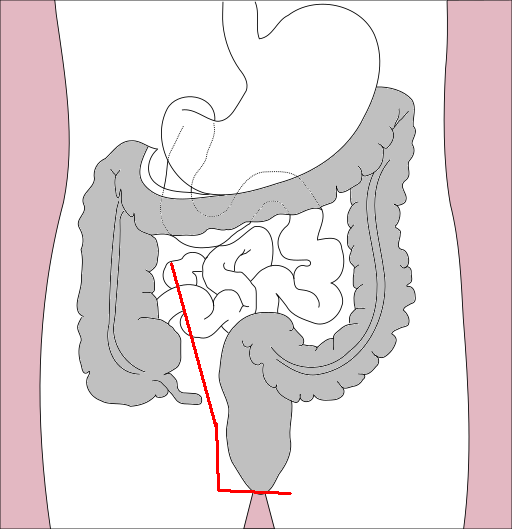
- Total proctocolectomy
- Specialty: Colorectal surgery

Proctocolectomy is the surgical removal of the entire colon and rectum from the human body, leaving the patients small intestine disconnected from their anus. It is a major surgery that is performed by colorectal surgeons, however some portions of the surgery, specifically the colectomy (removal of the colon) may be performed by general surgeons. It was first performed in 1978 and since that time, medical advancements have led to the surgery being less invasive with great improvements in patient outcomes. The procedure is most commonly indicated for severe forms of inflammatory bowel disease such as ulcerative colitis and Crohn's disease. It is also the treatment of choice for patients with familial adenomatous polyposis.

== Indications ==
According to the guidelines published by the American Society of Colon and rectal surgery, a proctocolectomy can be considered in patients who are suffering from severe ulcerative colitis (UC), a form of inflammatory bowel disease. This procedure is considered curative for this condition because UC only affects the large colon and rectum. Proctocolectomy may also be performed for severe Crohn’s disease, another form of inflammatory bowel disease, however this intervention is not considered curative. Surgical intervention for Crohn's disease is only pursued when medications are no longer effective or when extensive damage to the large colon and rectum has occurred. The final most common indication for proctocolectomy is for individuals who suffer from Familial Adenomatous Polyposis. This is a condition that is inherited from past generations and leads to dozens or even thousands of polyps inside the colon and rectum that can then become cancerous.

== Procedure steps ==
The surgical removal of the entire colon and rectum is a major surgery with many complex steps involved. In brief, the surgeon will begin by making an incision in the patient’s belly and then expose the colon (large intestine). They will then remove the entire large intestine being careful not to damage any other nearby internal organs. Next the surgeon will remove the patient’s rectum. Lastly the surgeon will connect the patient’s small intestine to their anus so that they will be able continue having bowel movements from their bottom. This is known as an ileoanal anastomosis. The surgeon preserves the patient’s anus and sphincter muscles in order to prevent fecal incontinence when the small intestine is connected to the anus.

== Possible complications ==
As previously stated, a proctocolectomy is a major surgery and with that comes the risk of complications. The major risks of the surgery include damage to nearby organs and nerves within the body, infection, scar tissue within the belly that can lead to small intestine blockage, poor absorption of nutrients and incisional hernias.

== See also ==
- List of surgeries by type
