= Cecectomy =

Surgical removal of the secum

- Specialty: Gastroenterology

Cecectomy is a surgical procedure in which the cecum is removed partially or totally. It can be done in cases like carcinoid syndrome, primary or secondary cancer.
