= Anal sphincterotomy =

Surgical cutting of the anal sphincter muscles

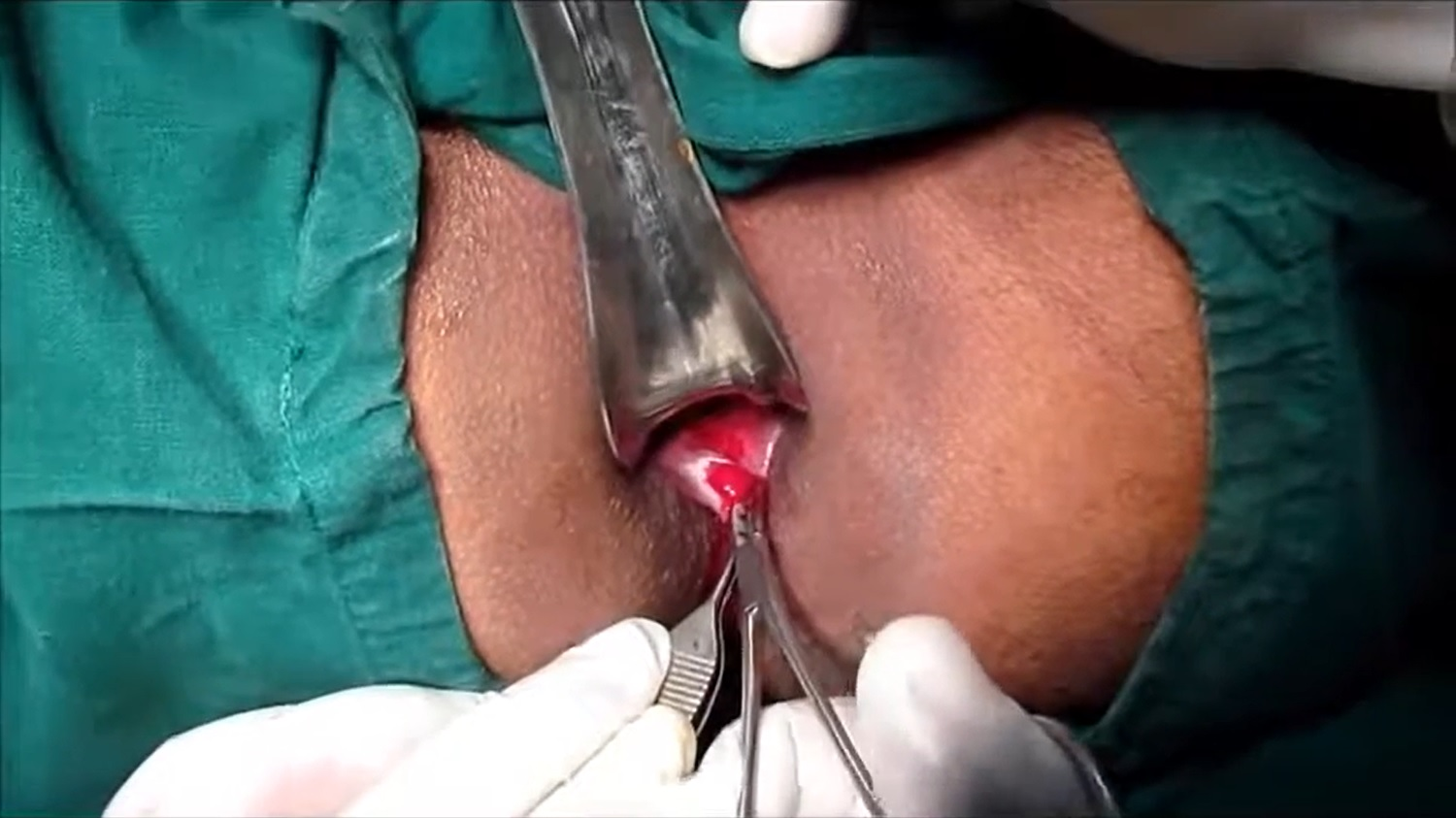
- Anal fissure treatment, lateral sphincterotomy
- ICD-9-CM: 49.5

Anal sphincterotomy is a surgical procedure that involves treating mucosal fissures from the anal canal/sphincter. The word is formed from sphincter + otomy (to cut, to separate).

== Procedure ==
1. The surgery can be performed under any kind of anesthesia.
2. After anesthesia is administered, the area is cleaned with an antiseptic solution.
3. The sphincter is separated either by simply stretching or cutting. Cutting the muscle prevents spasm and temporarily weakens the muscles. Both methods help the underlying area to heal.
4. Remove the fissure and any underlying scar tissue.
5. Suture back the wound.

== See also ==
- Lateral internal sphincterotomy
- List of surgeries by type
