= Alarplasty =

- Other names: Alaplasty
- [edit on Wikidata]

Alarplasty (or, less commonly, alaplasty) is a plastic surgery procedure in which a wedge of the wing of the nose is removed in order to alter the shape of the nostrils. Alarplasty may be used to increase or decrease the width of the nostrils, for either cosmetic or functional reasons. In humans it may also make the nose perceptibly narrower.

Temporary swelling is a common consequence of alarplasty.

== See also ==
- Rhinoplasty
- Septoplasty
