= Arytenoidectomy =

Surgery treating airway narrowing in larynx

Arytenoidectomy is a surgical procedure performed on the arytenoid cartilage, which is located in the larynx or voice box. This surgery is typically used to treat conditions such as severe laryngeal stenosis, where the airway becomes narrowed due to scarring or other factors.

== Procedure ==
During an arytenoidectomy, the surgeon removes the arytenoid cartilage. The arytenoid cartilages are a pair of pyramid-shaped structures in the larynx (voice box) that play an essential role in vocal sound production. Various techniques, such as laser surgery or conventional surgical instruments, may be employed based on the severity of the stenosis and the patient's specific requirements. Typically performed under general anesthesia, arytenoidectomy necessitates hospitalization for postoperative observation and recovery. Patients might experience temporary hoarseness or swallowing difficulties as the area heals.
