= Omentopexy =

Surgical procedure

- ICD-9-CM: 54.74

Omentopexy is a surgical procedure whereby the greater omentum is sutured to a nearby organ. Suture to the abdominal wall is used to induce circulation away from the portal circulation into caval circulation. It may also be sutured to another organ to increase arterial circulation.
