= Gastroenterostomy =

Surgical procedure connecting the stomach and the jejunum

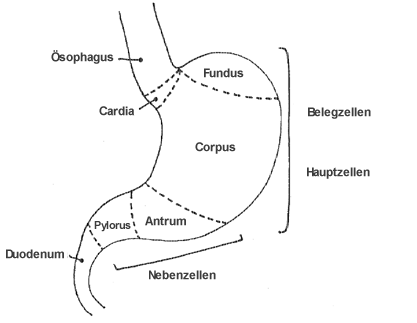
- Diagram of the stomach, showing the different regions.
- ICD-9-CM: 44.3
- MeSH: D005763

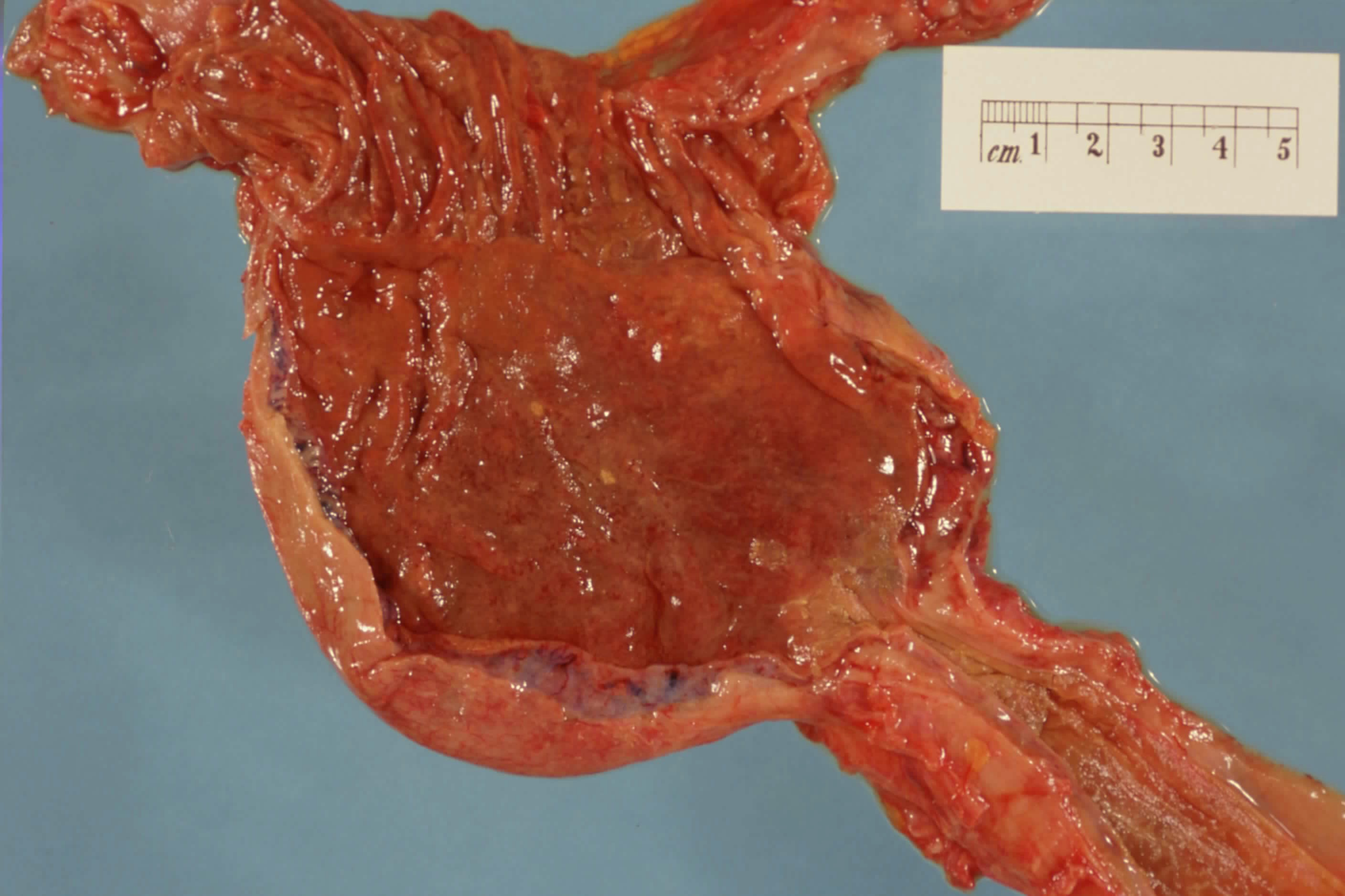
Gastroenterostomy, anastomosis of gastric cardia to jejunum

A gastroenterostomy is the surgical creation of a connection between the stomach and the jejunum. The operation can sometimes be performed at the same time as a partial gastrectomy (the removal of part of the stomach). Gastroenterostomy was in the past typically performed to treat peptic ulcers, but today it is usually carried out to enable food to pass directly to the middle section of the small intestine when it is necessary to bypass the first section (the duodenum) because of duodenal damage. The procedure is still being used to treat gastroparesis that is refractory to other treatments, but it is now rarely used to treat peptic ulcers because most cases thereof are bacterial in nature (due to Helicobacter pylori) and there are many new drugs available to treat the gastric reflux often experienced with peptic ulcer disease. Reported cure rates for H. pylori infection range from 70% to 90% after antibiotic treatment.

== See also ==
- List of surgeries by type
