= Gastroduodenostomy =

Gastroenterological surgical procedure

- Specialty: Gastroenterology

Gastroduodenostomy is a surgical procedure where the doctor creates a new connection between the stomach and the duodenum. This procedure may be performed in cases of stomach cancer or in the case of a malfunctioning pyloric valve.

== See also ==
- List of surgeries by type
