= Glossectomy =

Surgical procedure removing all or part of the tongue

- ICD-9-CM: 25.2-25.4
- MeSH: D005927

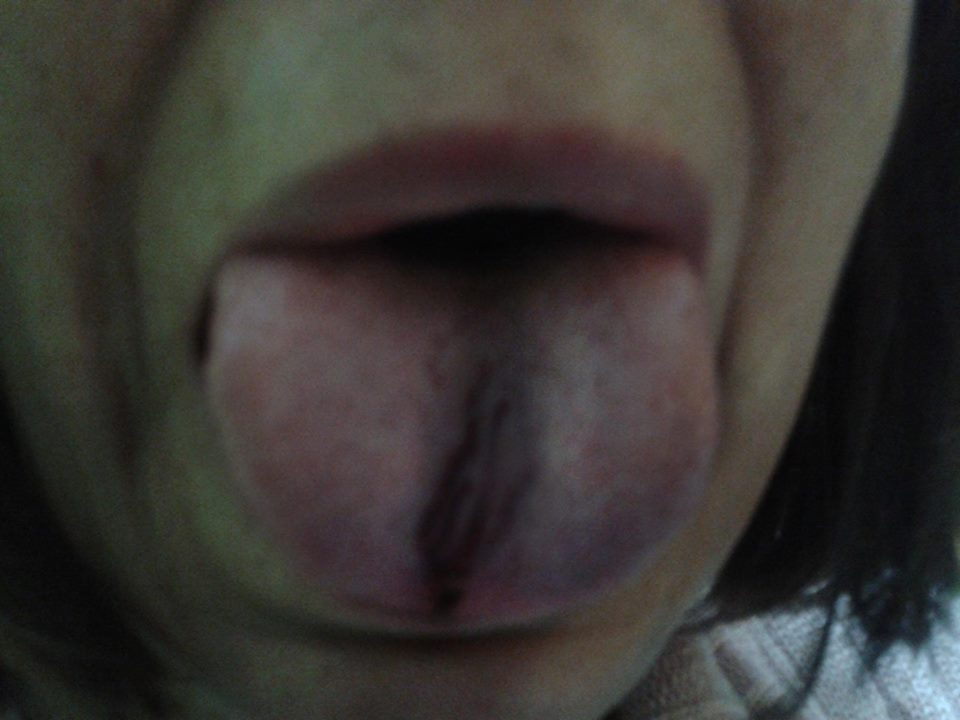
Patient’s tongue with glossectomy

A glossectomy is the surgical removal of all or part of the tongue. It is performed in order to curtail malignant growth such as oral cancer. When only a portion of the tongue needs to be removed, the procedure is called a partial removal, or hemiglossectomy. When the entire tongue needs to be removed, the procedure is called a total glossectomy. A midline glossectomy is a surgical reduction of the size of the base of the tongue (posterior two-thirds of the tongue), sometimes used to treat sleep apnea.

If the size of the resulting defect is too large, patients may have difficulty with speaking or swallowing. In this case, the patient may benefit from a free flap to restore volume in the missing portion of the tongue.

== See also ==
- List of surgeries by type
