= Uvulotomy =

Surgical removal of the uvula

- ICD-9-CM: 27.7

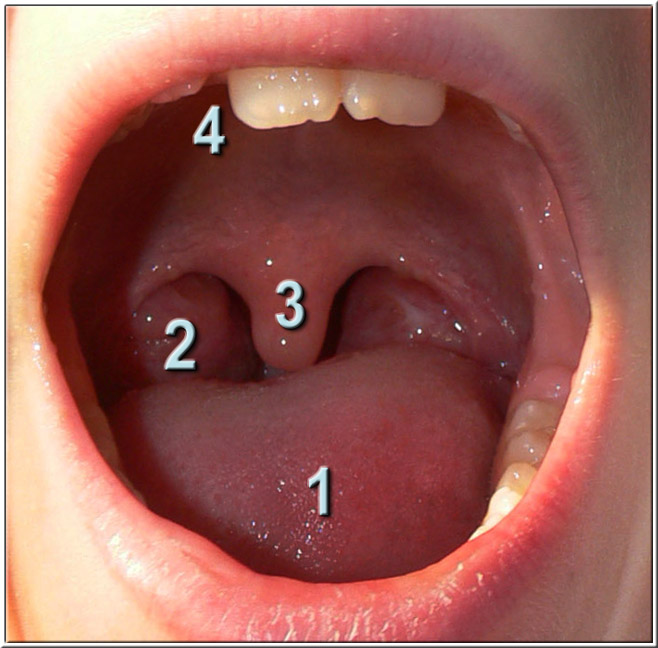
palatine uvula (3)

A uvulotomy, staphylotomy, or uvulectomy is any cutting operation performed on the uvula.

The procedure was performed in European medieval medicine. The Norwegian Eiríkr Hákonarson bled to death following such an operation.

Uvulotomy is employed as folk medicine in some countries including Tigray. It is sometimes part of a naming ceremony, most commonly in Niger, but also sometimes in Israel, and the Maghreb region. On the child's 7th day the uvula is removed in a religious ritual. This practice is called "traditional uvulectomy" to distinguish it from medical treatment.

In the 20th century uvulotomy came to be used as a treatment for snoring. See uvulopalatopharyngoplasty.

Its CPT 2009 code is "42140, Uvulectomy".
