= Panniculus =

Dense layer of fatty tissue within the lower abdominal region

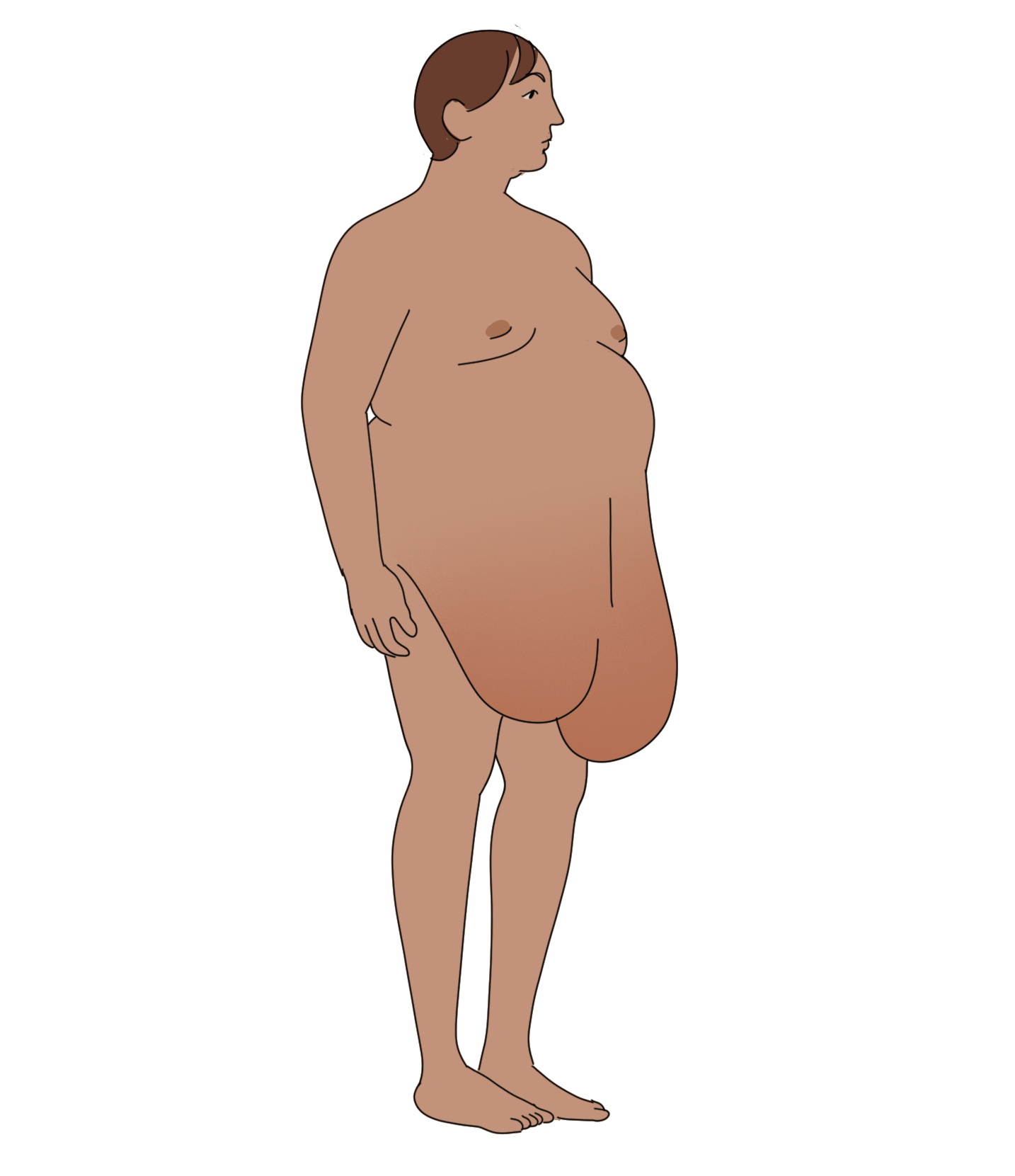
Illustration of a male with discoloured panniculus.

The panniculus (often incorrectly referred to as pannus) is a dense layer of fatty tissue consisting of excess subcutaneous fat within the lower abdominal region. Panniculi can form after rapid weight loss, as seen with strict exercise plans, in which case the abdominal fat is successfully reduced, but then excess skin hangs loosely over the area. (It can be a result of obesity. Abdominal panniculus can be removed during abdominal panniculectomy, a type of abdominoplasty. A panniculus can also be the result of loose tissues after pregnancy or massive weight loss.

== See also ==
- Intertrigo
- Panniculus adiposus
- Panniculus carnosus
- Weber–Christian disease
