= Facetectomy =

Neurosurgical procedure

- Specialty: Neurosurgery
- ICD-9-CM: 84.8

Facetectomy is a surgical procedure which involves decompression of a spinal nerve root. For example, it can be performed in severely resistant cases of cervical rhizalgia, where the cervical nerve roots within the intervertebral foramina are decompressed.
