= Auriculectomy =

Surgical removal of ears

Auriculectomy is the surgical removal of the ear due to disease or trauma, generally followed by rehabilitation involving an ear prosthesis.
