= Cholecystenterostomy =

Abdominal surgery

- Other names: Cholecystoenterostomy
- Specialty: Gastroenterology

A cholecystenterostomy (or cholecystoenterostomy) is a surgical procedure in which the gallbladder is joined to the small intestine. It is performed in order to allow bile to pass from the liver to the intestine when the common bile duct is obstructed by an irremovable cause.

== Variants ==
Cholecystenterostomy serves as the umbrella term for any connection between the gallbladder and the small intestine. It is specifically classified based on the anatomical segment of the intestine utilized:

- Cholecystoduodenostomy: The connection between the gallbladder and the duodenum. It is used for biliary drainage, most commonly to bypass distal biliary obstruction or decompress the gallbladder.
- Cholecystojejunostomy: The connection between the gallbladder and the jejunum, This is usually performed as a Roux-en-Y reconstruction. It is also used when a longer bypass is more needed such as in selected malignant biliary obstructions and can reduce biliary reflux rather than a cholecystoduodenostomy.

== Procedure and Techniques ==
The surgical creation of the anastomosis can be performed via an open laparotomy or using minimally invasive methods, including laparoscopy or robotic surgery.

== See also ==
- Choledochoduodenostomy
- Cholecystostomy
- Digestive system surgery
