= Ureterosigmoidostomy =

- ICD-9-CM: 56.71

A ureterosigmoidostomy is a surgical procedure wherein the ureters, which carry urine from the kidneys, are diverted into the sigmoid colon. It is performed as a secondary treatment in bladder cancer patients who have undergone cystectomy. Rarely, the cancer can present in children between the ages of 2 & 10 years old as an aggressive rhabdomyosarcoma, although there have been diagnoses of children as young as 3 months old. The procedure was also used several decades ago as a correctional procedure for patients born with bladder exstrophy. In the case of some bladder exstrophy patients, occasional bowel incontinence (in this case, a mixture of urine and feces similar to diarrhea) at night is one uncontrollable consequence.

Another consequence of this procedure is an increased risk of kidney infections (nephritis) due to bacteria from feces travelling back up the ureters (reflux). Patients are commonly put on oral prophylactic antibiotics to combat infections in the ureteral tract and kidneys, but this can lead to tolerance of the antibiotic. Consequently, the patient can build up tolerance to a large number of oral antibiotics, leading to the need for inpatient administration of IV (intravenous) antibiotics.

Additionally, the urine entering the colon can cause diarrhea and salt imbalance due to the sodium and chloride in the urine. Urea levels in the blood are higher due to urea crossing the colon wall. In the large intestine, sodium is swapped for potassium, and chloride for bicarbonate. This causes hypokalemia and acidosis. Many patients take sodium bicarbonate to combat this.

Patients with ureterosigmoidostomy have a 100 times greater chance of developing carcinoma of the colon after living with the modification for a number of years (an average of 20–30 years after the operation), 24% of patients go on to develop carcinoma of the bowel.

This operation is no longer popular in many countries, with an ileal conduit (where the ureters lead into a loop of small intestine) being preferred. However, ureterosigmoidostomy is still popular in developing countries, as the maintenance of an ileal conduit or catheter is seen to be more difficult.
