= Foraminotomy =

Surgical procedure to widen the intervertebral foramina

- ICD-9-CM: 03.09
- MedlinePlus: 007390

Foraminotomy is a medical operation used to relieve pressure on nerves that are being compressed by the intervertebral foramina, the passages through the bones of the vertebrae of the spine that pass nerve bundles to the body from the spinal cord.

A foraminotomy is performed to relieve the symptoms of nerve root compression in cases where the foramen is being compressed by bone, disc, scar tissue, or excessive ligament development and results in a pinched nerve.

The procedure is often performed as a minimally invasive procedure in which an incision is made in the back, the muscle peeled away to reveal the bone underneath, and a small hole cut into the vertebra itself. Through this hole, using an arthroscope, the foramen can be visualized, and the impinging bone or disk material removed. Surgery is typically short in duration, taking around 6 hours. Patients stay in hospital for 5-8 nights, can drive after 8 weeks, perform light duties after 8 weeks and make a full recovery within 18 months.

== Foraminectomy ==
A foraminotomy that removes a large amount of bone or other material may occasionally be described as a foraminectomy.
