= Lateral internal sphincterotomy =

- Specialty: Colorectal surgery
- ICD-9-CM: 49.51

Lateral internal sphincterotomy is an operation performed on the internal anal sphincter muscle for the treatment of a chronic anal fissure. The internal anal sphincter is one of two muscles that comprise the anal sphincter which controls the passage of feces. The procedure helps by lowering the resting pressure of the internal anal sphincter, which improves blood supply to the fissure and allows faster healing. The procedure has been shown to be very effective, with 96% of fissures healing at a median of three weeks in one trial.

== Indications ==
Lateral internal sphincterotomy is the preferred method of surgery for persons with chronic anal fissures, and is generally used when medical therapy has failed. It is associated with a lower rate of side effects than older techniques such as posterior internal sphincterotomy and anoplasty, and has also been shown to be superior to topical glyceryl trinitrate (GTN 0.2% ointment) in long term healing of fissures, with no difference in fecal continence.

== Surgical technique ==
Lateral internal sphincterotomy is a minor operation which can be carried out under either local or general anaesthesia; a report in 1981 showed that general anaesthesia is preferable due to high rates of fissure recurrence in patients treated under local anaesthesia. This operation is generally carried out as a day case procedure. It can be performed with either "open" or "closed" techniques:

- the open technique involves making an incision across the intersphincteric groove, separating the internal sphincter from the anal mucosa by blunt dissection, and dividing the internal sphincter using scissors.
- the closed technique or subcutaneous technique involves making a small incision at the intersphincteric groove, inserting a scalpel with the blade parallel to the internal sphincter and advancing it along the intersphincteric groove, and then rotating the scalpel towards the internal sphincter and dividing it.

In both techniques the lower one third to one half of the internal sphincter is divided, to lower the resting pressure without destroying the effect of the sphincter. The closed technique results in a smaller wound, but both techniques appear to be similarly effective.

== Complications ==
- Minor fecal incontinence and difficulty controlling flatulence are common side effects following surgery. Persistent minor fecal incontinence has been reported in 1.2% to 35% of patients; however, this does not appear to be significantly different to the rate of minor fecal incontinence experienced by patients treated with topical GTN.
- Hemorrhage can occur, more often with the open technique, and may require suture ligation.
- Perianal abscess occurs in about 1% of closed sphincterotomies, generally in association with anal fistula caused by a breach of the anal mucosa by the scalpel. Incision and drainage of the abscess and fistulotomy are required.

== See also ==
- List of surgeries by type
