= Laminotomy =

Surgical procedure to widen the vertebral canal

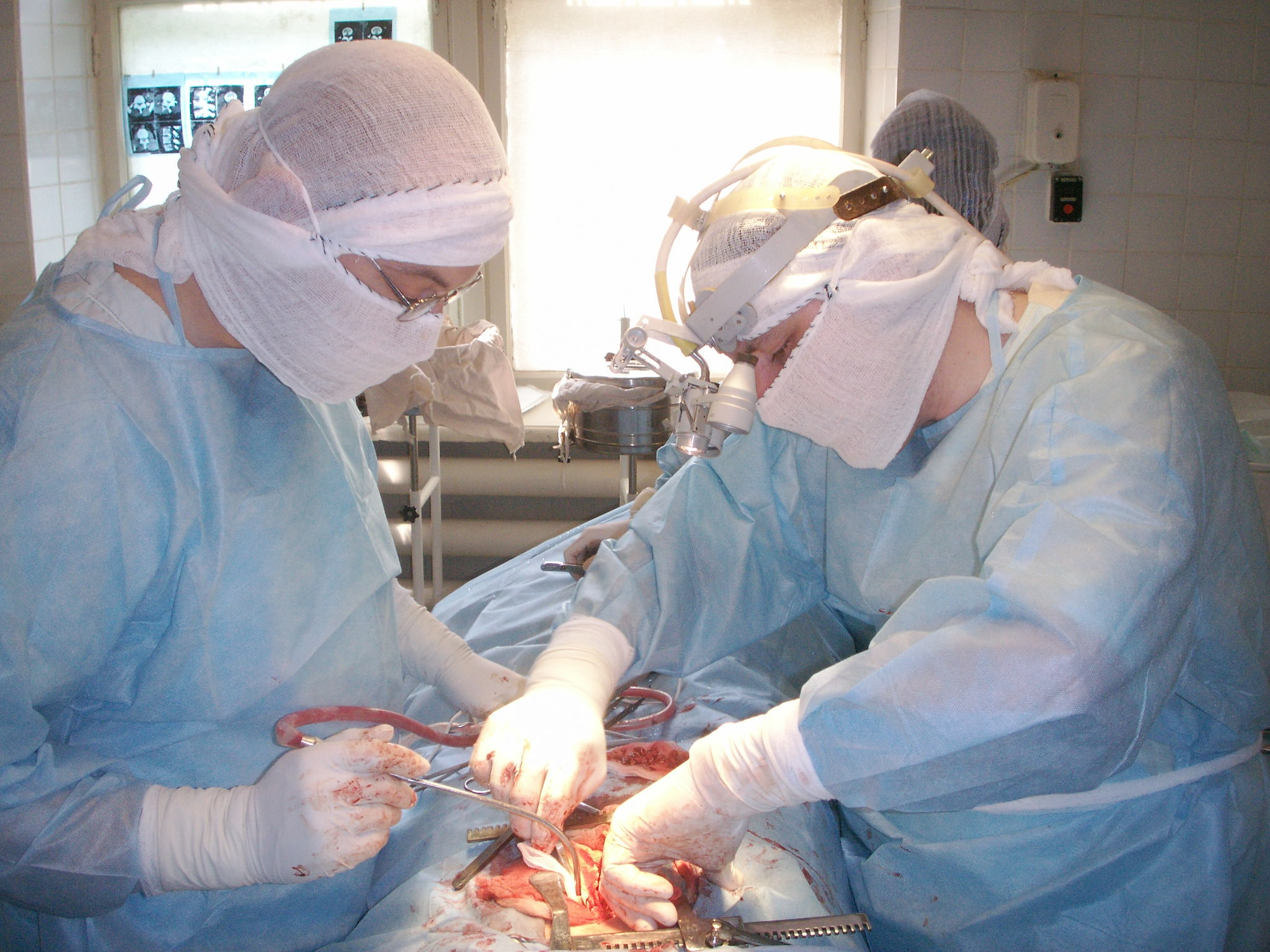
- Surgery on vertebral column
- Specialty: Neurosurgeon

A laminotomy is an orthopaedic neurosurgical procedure that removes part of the lamina of a vertebral arch in order to relieve pressure in the vertebral canal. A laminotomy is less invasive than conventional vertebral column surgery techniques, such as laminectomy because it leaves more ligaments and muscles attached to the spinous process intact and it requires removing less bone from the vertebra. As a result, laminotomies typically have a faster recovery time and result in fewer postoperative complications. Nevertheless, possible risks can occur during or after the procedure like infection, hematomas, and dural tears. Laminotomies are commonly performed as treatment for lumbar spinal stenosis and herniated disks. MRI and CT scans are often used pre- and post surgery to determine if the procedure was successful.

== Anatomy overview ==
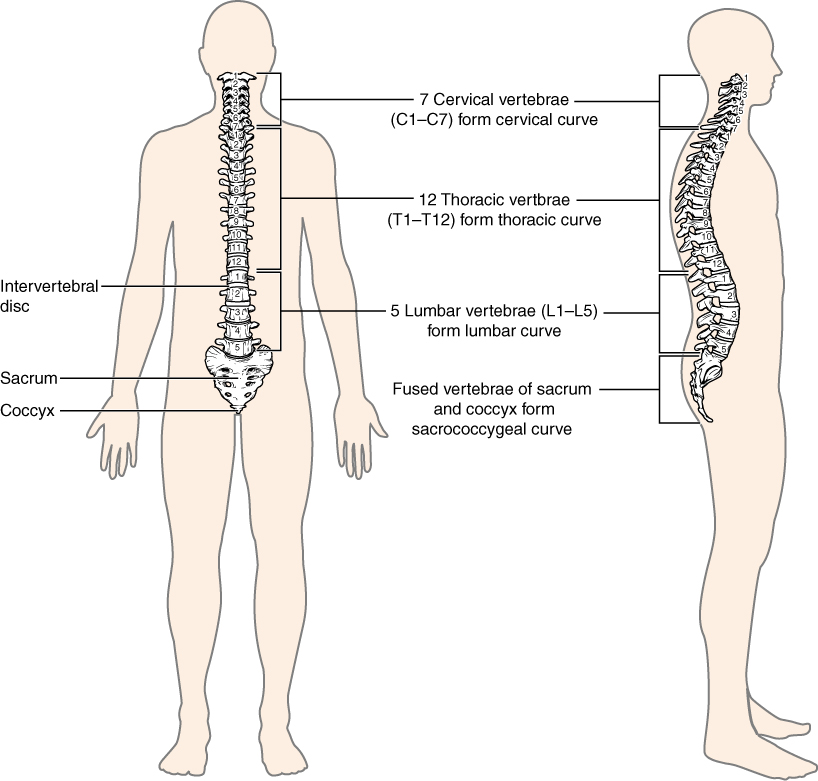
Human vertebral column

Vertebra superior view

The spinal cord is housed in a bony hollow tube called the vertebral column. The vertebral column is composed of many ring-like bones called vertebrae, and it spans from the skull to the sacrum. Each vertebra has a hole in the center called the vertebral foramen through which the spinal cord traverses.

Laminae (singular: lamina) are the anatomical structures of primary importance in a laminotomy. Laminae are part of the vertebral arch which is the region of bone on the back side of each vertebra that forms a protective covering for the back side of the spinal cord.

The vertebral arch is composed of several anatomical features in addition to laminae that must be taken into account when performing a laminotomy. In the center of the vertebral arch is a bony projection called the spinous process. The spinous process is located on the posterior or back side of the vertebra and serves as the attachment point for ligaments and muscles which support and stabilize the vertebral column. Each vertebra has two lateral bony projections called the transverse processes, located on either side of the vertebral arch. Transverse processes come into contact with the ribs and serve as attachment points for muscles and ligaments that stabilize the vertebral column. The lamina is the segment of bone that connects the spinous process to the transverse process. Each vertebra has two lamina, one on each side of the spinous process.

Vertebral column:lLamina

== Types ==
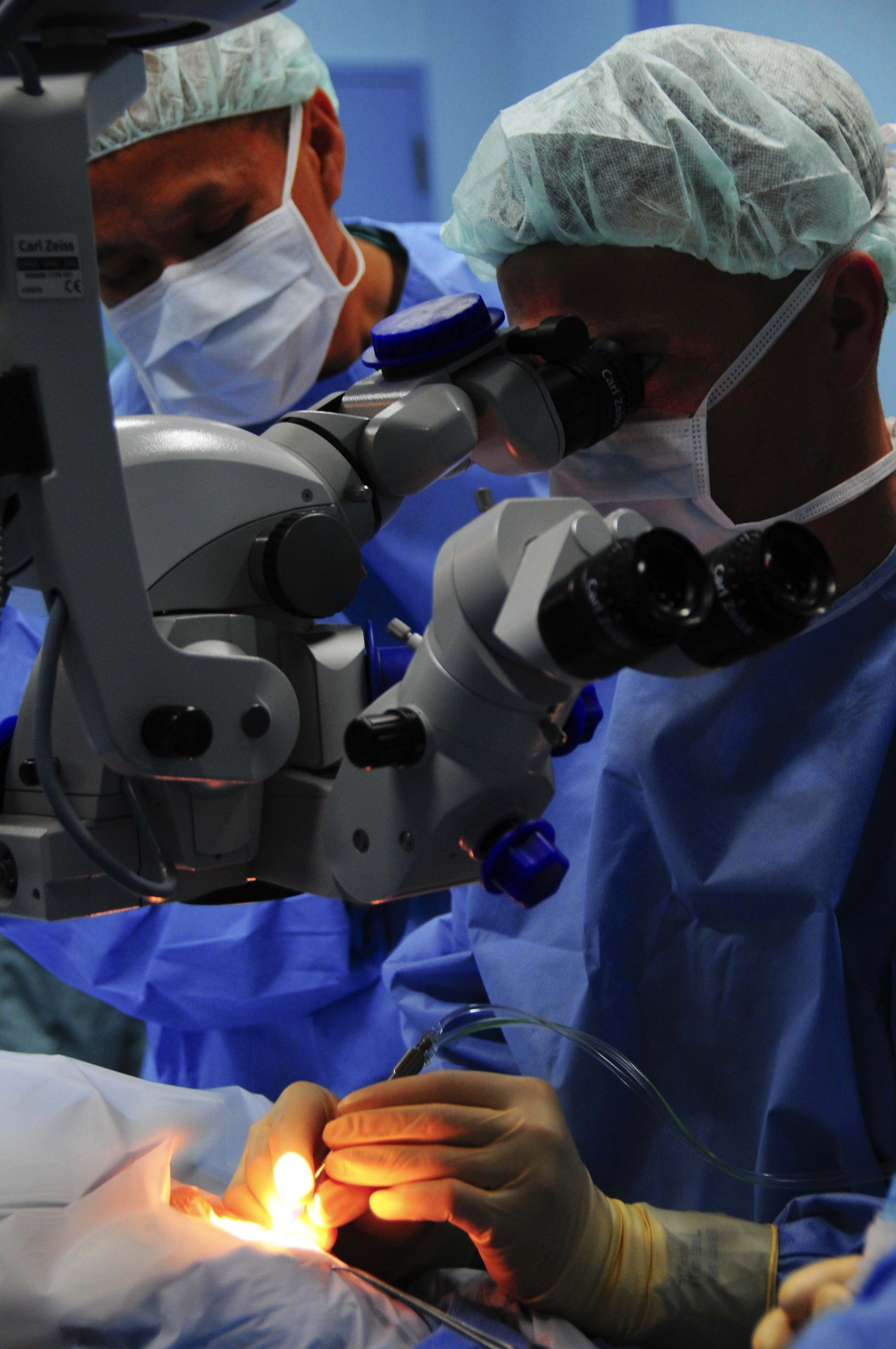
US Navy Cmdr. Kenneth Kubis, director of surgical services aboard the Military Sealift Command hospital ship USNS Mercy, uses an operating microscope.

Different types of laminotomy are defined by the type of instrument used to visualize the procedure, what vertebra the procedure is performed on, and whether or not both lamina of a vertebra are operated on or just one.G

Common types of laminotomy:

- Microscopic/microdecompression laminotomy uses an operating microscope in order to magnify the area being operated on. The operating microscope is typically mounted to the surgery table and held over the area of operation
- Endoscopic/microendoscopic decompression laminotomy uses an endoscope, a small tube-shaped camera inserted into the patient in order to visualize the procedure internally.
- Cervical laminotomy is performed on cervical vertebrae, the ones closest to the head.
- Thoracic laminotomy is performed on thoracic (middle) vertebrae.
- Lumbar laminotomy is performed on lumbar vertebrae, the ones closest to the sacrum.
- Bilateral laminotomy is removal of a part of the bone from both lamina of a single vertebra.
- Unilateral laminotomy is removal of a part of the bone from only one lamina.

These classifications of laminotomies can be combined to form the most descriptive name for the procedure possible. For example, an endoscopic unilateral lumbar laminotomy is the removal of bone from only one lamina of a lumbar vertebrae using an endoscope.

== Procedure ==
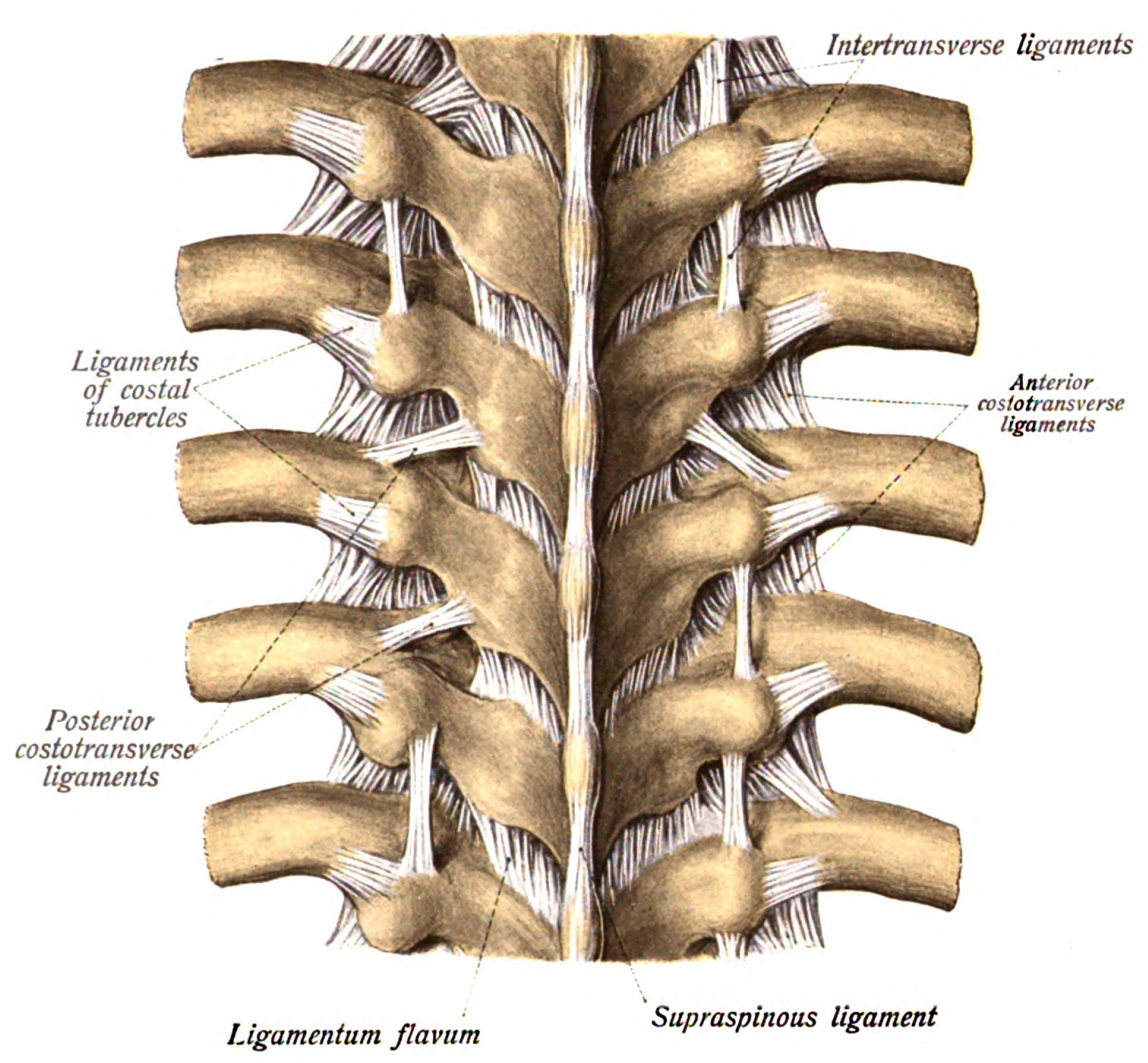
Ligamentum flavum

The procedure of a laminotomy remains largely the same regardless of the instrument used, or the level of vertebra operated on. Laminotomies require general or spinal anesthesia and frequently require a hospital stay following the procedure—although the duration of the stay depends on the physical condition of the individual and their reason for having a laminotomy. A laminotomy takes about 70–85 minutes depending on the type of procedure used. Unilateral laminotomies typically require less time because bone is removed from only one lamina, whereas bilateral laminotomies usually take more time because bone is removed from both laminae. The level of the vertebrae that the laminotomy is performed on and what instrument is used produce no significant differences in the length of the procedure. Both unilateral and bilateral laminotomies are performed in a shorter time than a conventional laminectomy, which takes over 100 minutes on average.

During a laminotomy, the individual lies on his or her stomach with the back facing up towards the physician. An initial incision is made down the middle of the back exposing the vertebrae on which the laminotomy will be performed. In this procedure, the spinous process and the ligaments of the vertebral column are kept intact, but the muscles adjacent to the vertebral column known as the paraspinous muscles (example: spinalis muscle) must be separated from the spinous process and vertebral arch. In a unilateral laminotomy, these muscles are detached only from the side on which the laminotomy is being performed. During a bilateral laminotomy, these muscles must be removed on both sides of the vertebrae. The ligaments connecting the lamina of upper and lower vertebrae, known as Ligamenta flava are often removed or remodeled in this procedure to adjust for the small amount of bone lost. Using either a microscope or an endoscope to have a visual of the procedure, a small surgical drill is used to remove a part of bone from one or both laminae of the vertebrae. Laminotomies can be performed on multiple vertebrae during the same surgery; this is known as a multi-level laminotomy.

A slightly different, but commonly used procedure of laminotomy is the unilateral laminotomy for bilateral spinal decompression. This minimally invasive procedure is often used to treat patients with excessive pressure in the vertebral column that must be relieved. In this procedure, the same spinal ligaments are kept intact and the paraspinous muscles must still be detached. A unilateral laminotomy is performed on one lamina of a vertebra. This removal of bone from one lamina provides an opening into the spinal canal. Using a microscope or an endoscope to visualize the procedure, surgical tools are inserted through this opening into the spinal canal. The surgical tools are then navigated underneath the spinous process and across the spinal canal to reach the other lamina on the opposite side of the vertebra to perform a second laminotomy. The incision for this procedure is smaller because doctors need only access one lamina yet can perform a bilateral laminotomy—remove bone from both lamina of a single vertebra. The unilateral laminotomy with bilateral spinal decompression procedure was developed almost 20 years ago and is a common successful surgical treatment for lumbar spinal stenosis.

== Reasons for performing a laminotomy ==
A laminotomy is typically used to relieve pressure from the spinal canal. Excessive pressure in the spinal canal causes the spinal canal and spinal nerves to be compressed which can be very painful and can impair motor control and/or sensation. A common disorder that causes increased pressure in the spinal canal is lumbar spinal stenosis. Lumbar spinal stenosis is formally defined as a decline in diameter length of either the neural foramina, lateral recess, or spinal canal. Stenosis is classified as a decaying disease because it causes the canal to gradually become more and more narrow which can cause pain or loss of function. Common symptoms of lumbar stenosis are pain, fatigue, weakness of the muscle and numbness. Stenosis can be caused by old age or an injury to the vertebral column and usually requires a CT scan or MRI to diagnose. Performing a laminotomy can relieve pressure in the spinal canal caused by lumbar stenosis and therefore alleviate symptoms.

Laminotomies are also performed to create a window into the spinal canal. Laminotomies are frequently used as a way to surgically repair a spinal disc herniation at any level of the vertebral column (cervical, thoracic, lumbar). A herniated disc can compress spinal nerves and cause intense pain and impaired sensation. Removing a portion of the lamina allows physicians to be able to access and repair the herniated disc. Laminotomies may also be used to treat intraspinal lesions such as spinal tumor or problems with the blood vessels supplying the spinal cord. In any scenario where the inside of the spinal canal must be accessed or there is an increase in pressure in the spinal canal, laminotomy may be used to treat the disorder or alleviate symptoms.

=== Benefits ===
The laminotomy procedure has many benefits as to why it is a preferred spinal surgery since it is less invasive than other spinal procedures such as a laminectomy or a spinal fusion. Once a laminotomy procedure is done, patients have a great improvement in their pain and mobility. Laminotomies are usually safer than other surgeries that are open or invasive. This surgery usually is shorter than other spinal decompression procedures by having an average duration of 70–85 minutes, whereas other decompression surgeries can have a duration anywhere from 90 to 109 minutes. Laminotomies are usually more cost efficient than other surgical decompression surgeries. In 2007, it was seen that laminotomies were around $10,000, whereas other surgical procedures were around $24,000. Smaller skin incisions and scarring as well as less surgical trauma are also a benefit of laminotomy. With this procedure there is usually a faster recovery time, and a shorter hospital stay if one is necessary at all. During the surgery there is also a benefit of minimizing the injury to muscles, ligaments, and bones in the spine since more invasive surgeries have a greater risk of damaging them. General anesthesia is usually required, but postoperative spinal instability is typically limited.

=== Risks and potential complications ===
Since this procedure is a surgical technique there are many complications that can occur either during or after the surgery. Some major complications that can occur are cerebrospinal fluid leaks, dural tears, infection, or epidural hematomas. Death is also a risk; however, it occurs only once per thousand surgeries. Other potential complications are nerve root damage, which can lead to nerve injury or paraplegia, and a significant amount of blood loss that will lead to blood transfusions.

== Laminotomy versus laminectomy ==
Historically, laminectomies have been the primary way to treat lumbar spinal stenosis. A laminectomy is a more invasive method with the aim to decrease the total amount of pain and numbness associated with lumbar spinal stenosis. It is a surgery that eliminates the entire lamina to allow the nerves around this region to function properly. Laminectomies also often produce a longer recovery time as well as a greater risk for post-operative complications. There is typically more damage to the surrounding muscle tissue accompanied by a laminectomy. Since a laminectomy involves the excision of the entire lamina, a laminectomy will usually cause more spinal instability than a laminotomy. When going with the option of laminotomy, the procedure reduces the total amount of muscle severed. Because a laminotomy does not damage the spinous process and critical ligaments, there is not as much muscle weakness, pain, and lumbar instability seen with laminectomies. Laminotomies are fairly new compared to laminectomies, and it involves using less invasive methods with precise instruments to minimize the risk of tissue damage.

== Radiographic imaging ==
=== X-rays ===
For radiographic imaging, an x-ray is the least effective way to collect information when observing a patient with lumbar spinal stenosis. A CT scan provides a 360-degree compiled view of the vertebrae that is more precise than an x-ray.

=== MRI ===
MRI of the lumbar spine showing spinal stenosis

Since an MRI provides excellent imaging of blood vessels and tissues, it is recognized as the best type of imaging to observe signs associated with lumbar compression. The precise measurement of the diameter of the spinal canal is a particularly important component when determining the severity of the stenosis itself. High strength 3-Tesla MRI machines are being utilized due to the increased vascular imaging capabilities. Better resolution capacity allows for more detailed observations by the healthcare provider. The sharp contrast of the high power MRI outlines details in the vertebra that are critical when examining a patient with lumbar spinal stenosis who may need a laminotomy. MRI scanning post invasive surgery is used to see the quality of the surgery itself, yet the appropriate postoperative time elapsed before conducting an MRI is a debated topic.

=== CT scans ===
A CT scan is not the most effective imaging technique when observing lumbar abnormalities, however it can supplement an MRI by detecting certain degenerative processes. When determining whether or not a laminotomy will be beneficial for the patient, a healthcare provider must assess the severity of the possible abnormalities. Out of all the potential reasons to have a laminotomy performed, lumbar spinal stenosis is the chief reason. CT scans are used specifically to pinpoint a buckled lumbar ligamentum flavum as well as facet hypertrophy, which are some of the main pathophysiological changes indicative of lumbar spinal stenosis. Even though a CT scan can reveal these pertinent signs of lumbar spinal stenosis, it can sometimes give a cloudy image due to the shadowing of the tissue contrast. When this occurs, an intrathecal myelography contrast is conducted with the CT scan to fix the abnormal contrast. A CT scan can also reveal an increase in the cross sectional area of the L3 vertebrae, which ultimately decreases the cross sectional area of the spinal canal. As an increase in the size of the L3 vertebrae occurs, pressure builds up on the cauda equina, commonly causing pain in the lower back and lower extremities. Cauda equina compression can also be due to stenosis of L4-5 region as well. Even though the CT scan allows for intensive image studying, the fixed nature of the image collection process alone is not enough to reach a definitive diagnosis of lumbar spinal stenosis. The outcome of the CT scan can help compile physiological evidence that the patient has lumbar spinal stenosis, and that the patient may potentially benefit from a laminotomy to improve his or her quality of life.

Other than static imaging processes, a CT scan can also be used for observing changes in spinal canal features before and after a laminotomy. One of the main signs of lumbar spinal stenosis is the thickening of the ligamentum flavum, causing it to expand towards the spinal canal. When observing the cross sectional area of the spinal canal of a human cadaver, it was found that the area had decreased due to ligamentum flavum thickening. The ligamentum flavum did not appear to alter the dynamic alterations in the dimensions of the spinal cord. Even after the intervertebral disc was removed, the ligamentum flavum did not appear to be a factor in the change in the dimensions of the spinal canal. By understanding the magnitude of the role that ligamentum flavum hypertrophy plays in lumbar sacral stenosis, the necessity of an invasive lumbar spinal procedure can be accurately measured.

== Alternative minimally invasive procedures ==
Minimally invasive procedures are a more common alternative due to the decreased risk of damaging significant muscle tissue. The difference between invasive and minimally invasive spinal surgeries is that minimally invasive procedures involves a series of small incisions. Minimally invasive procedures can be performed anywhere along the spine, and have been used to treat various abnormalities. The percutaneous pedicle screw fixation technique allows for a procedure that presents minimal risk to the patient. Fluoroscopic image guided navigation through these portals allows for surgeons to perform more efficient procedures. Minimally invasive procedures often yield a much faster recovery time than fully invasive surgeries, making them more appealing to patients. Laminectomies have always been the gold standard when treating lumbar spinal stenosis, but less invasive surgeries have emerged as a safer alternative treatment that helps maintain the postoperative structural integrity of the spine.

=== Spinal microsurgery ===
Spinal microsurgery is a minimally invasive unilateral laminotomy used to correct bilateral lumbar spinal compression. Spinal microsurgery is the most common and effective microsurgical decompression treatment for patients who present with moderate to severe spinal stenosis. Spinal microsurgeries are performed with high magnification 3-D imaging of the fixated area of the spine, reducing the potential risk of harming the architecture of the spine itself.

=== Endoscopic spine surgery ===
Endoscopic spine surgeries can be used to treat thoracic lesions, and have been proven to be a much safer option than a thoracotomy. However, an endoscopic spine surgery can be performed to treat other spinal conditions, such as a herniated lumbar disc. Recovery time from this type of surgical treatment is often very quick, with patients ambulating within a few hours of the procedure.

=== Spinal fusion ===
Spinal fusion involves fusing two vertebrae together using a spacer, and is intended to prohibit movement at that particular segment. Screws are typically inserted to assure that the spacer is held in place. The most common lumbar spinal fusion occurs between L4 and L5. A lumbar spinal fusion may be recommended when non-surgical treatment options for severe degenerative disc disease are ineffective. A laminotomy would not be effective in this case, since this procedure concerns a degenerated disc that needs to be removed in order to relieve certain symptoms.
