= Hemipelvectomy =

Surgical removal of half of the pelvis

- Other names: Hindquarter amputation, pelvic resection
- Specialty: Orthopedic surgery

Hemipelvectomy, also known as a pelvic resection, is a surgical procedure that involves the removal of part of the pelvic girdle. This procedure is most commonly performed to treat oncologic conditions of the pelvis. Hemipelvectomy can be further classified as internal and external hemipelvectomy. An internal hemipelvectomy is a limb-sparing procedure where the innominate bone is resected while preserving the ipsilateral limb. An external hemipelvectomy involves the resection of the innominate bone plus amputation of the ipsilateral limb.

== Medical uses ==
Hemipelvectomy is generally reserved for the treatment of pelvic neoplasms. Examples of malignancies that are treated with hemipelvectomy include osteosarcoma, chondrosarcoma, and Ewing's sarcoma. Rarely, hemipelvectomy is performed in settings of traumatic injury and osteomyelitis. Indications for external hemipelvectomy include neoplastic extension into the sciatic nerve, where loss of function of the lower extremity is anticipated. Internal hemipelvectomy is preferred when complete resection of the tumor is possible without sacrificing the lower extremity. If external hemipelvectomy cannot provide a greater degree of tumor resection compared to internal hemipelvectomy, internal hemipelvectomy is recommended. Internal hemipelvectomy must only be considered when the surgical approach can ensure the preservation of critical neurovascular structures in the region.

== Complications ==
As with any surgical procedure, risks include infection, blood loss, damage to surrounding structures, cardiac/pulmonary complications, and adverse reactions to anesthesia.

Complications of external hemipelvectomy include:

- Disfigurement
- Loss of ambulation
- Phantom limb pain
- Bladder dysfunction
- Sexual dysfunction
- Bowel dysfunction

Complications of internal hemipelvectomy include:

- Leg-length discrepancy
- 'Flail hip' or 'floating hip' (referring to hypermobility of the hip joint)
- Hip instability

== Technique ==
Prior to performing a hemipelvectomy, surgeons must possess detailed knowledge of the pelvic anatomy and its relation to the pelvic tumor. Imaging studies such as conventional radiography, computed tomography, and magnetic resonance imaging help the surgeon visualize the anatomy and its relationship to the local pathology. Surgical oncology techniques are utilized when resecting tumors of the pelvis. Such techniques ensure that adequate resection margins are obtained at the time of surgery to minimize tumor recurrence.

The Enneking and Dunham classification system was developed in 1978 to aid surgeons in characterizing pelvic resections. This classification scheme breaks down pelvic resections into 3 subtypes: Type I, Type II, and Type III. Type I resections involve removal of the ilium. Type II resections involve removal of the peri-acetabular region. Type III resections involve removal of the ischial and/or pubic region.

Resection of pelvic bone typically requires subsequent reconstruction to ensure stability of the hip joint, particularly in internal hemipelvectomy. Examples of pelvic reconstruction include the use of an allograft, autograft, or prosthesis to bridge the remaining ends of pelvic bone following resection. Arthrodesis is a technique that can be used in internal hemipelvectomy to fix the proximal femur to a segment of pelvic bone for the purposes of stabilizing the lower extremity.

== Images ==
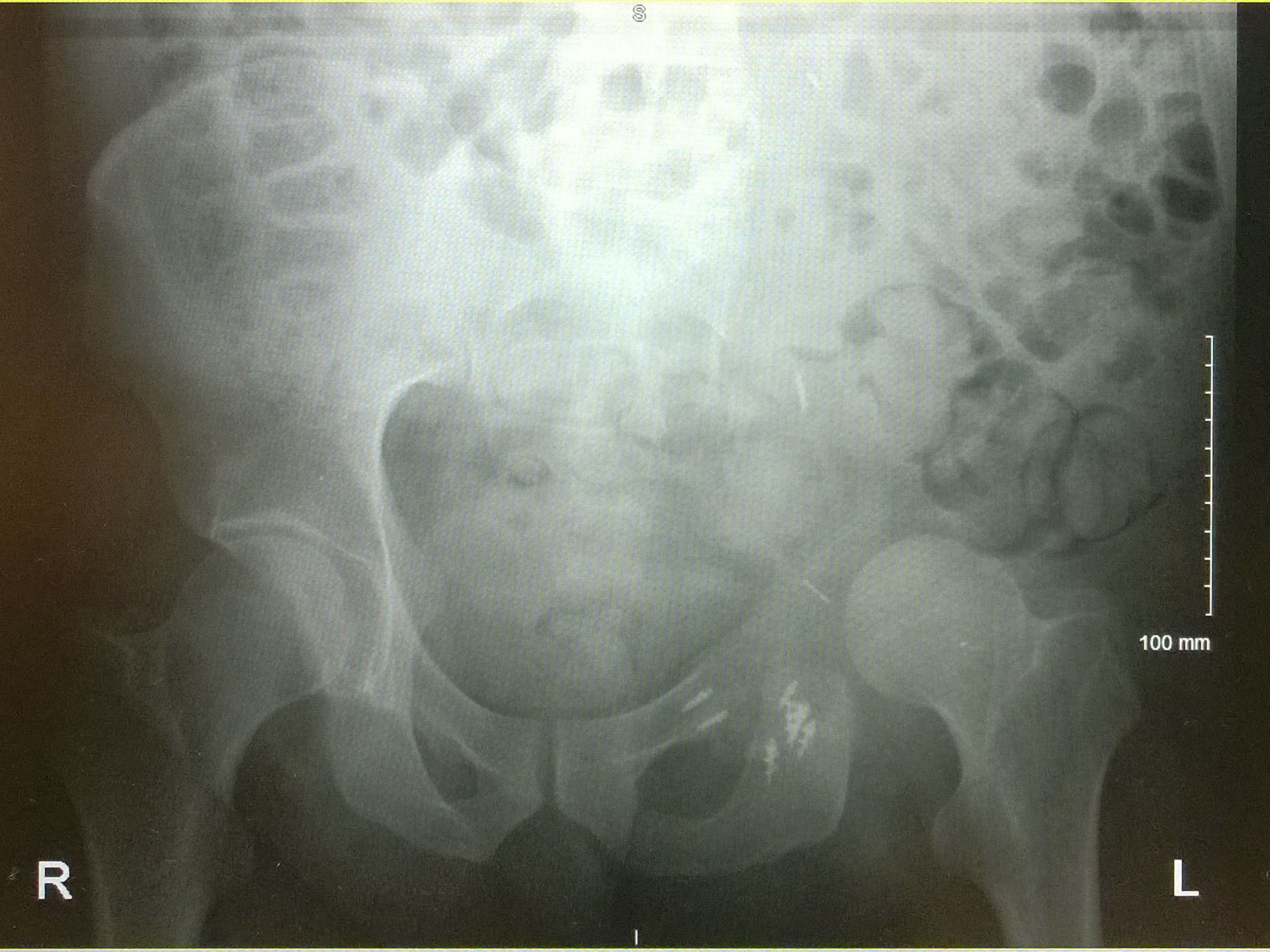
An x-ray of a limb-sparing hemipelvectomy on the left side of a male pelvis taken one month after surgery.

An x-ray of the same pelvis taken eighteen months after surgery highlighting the femur migration to its final resting place.
