= Corpectomy =

Surgical removal of all or part of a vertebra

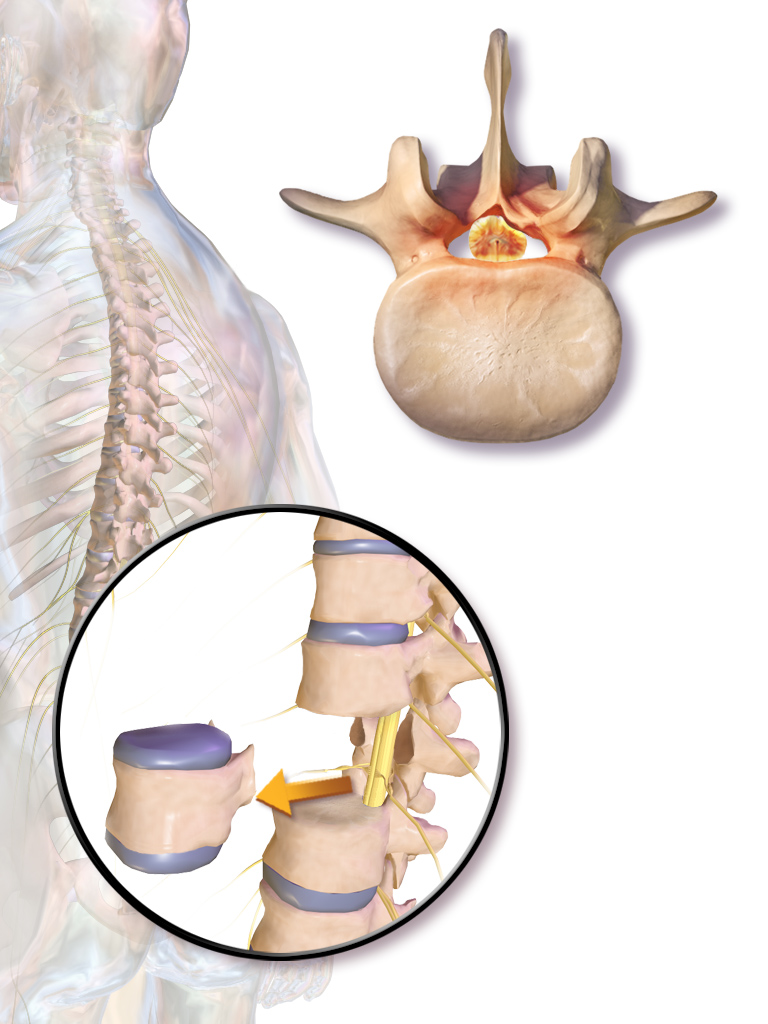
- Other names: Vertebrectomy
- Specialty: Neurosurgery
- ICD-9-CM: 80.99

A corpectomy or vertebrectomy is a surgical procedure that involves removing all or part of the vertebral body (Latin: corpus vertebrae, hence the name corpectomy), usually as a way to decompress the spinal cord and nerves. Corpectomy is often performed in association with some form of discectomy.

When the vertebral body has been removed, the surgeon performs a vertebral fusion. Because a space in the column remains from the surgery, it must be filled using a block of bone taken from the pelvis or one of the leg bones or with a manufactured component such as a cage. This bone graft holds the remaining vertebrae apart. As it heals, the vertebrae grow together and fuse.
