= Bernhard Bardenheuer =

German surgeon (1839–1913)

Bernhard Bardenheuer (July 12, 1839, Lamersdorf – August 13, 1913) was a German surgeon.

In 1864 he received his doctorate from Berlin, where he studied under Bernhard von Langenbeck (1810-1887). In 1865 he began work as an assistant to Karl Busch (1826-1881) at the surgical clinic at the University of Bonn, afterwards relocating to Heidelberg, where he worked under ophthalmologist Otto Becker (1828-1893) and surgeon Gustav Simon (1824-1876). During the Franco-Prussian War he served in a sick bay at a garrison in Heidelberg.

From 1872 he was a hospital surgeon in Köln, where in 1875 he introduced Listerian antisepsis. In 1884 he received the title of professor, even though he was not a member on any university's academic staff.

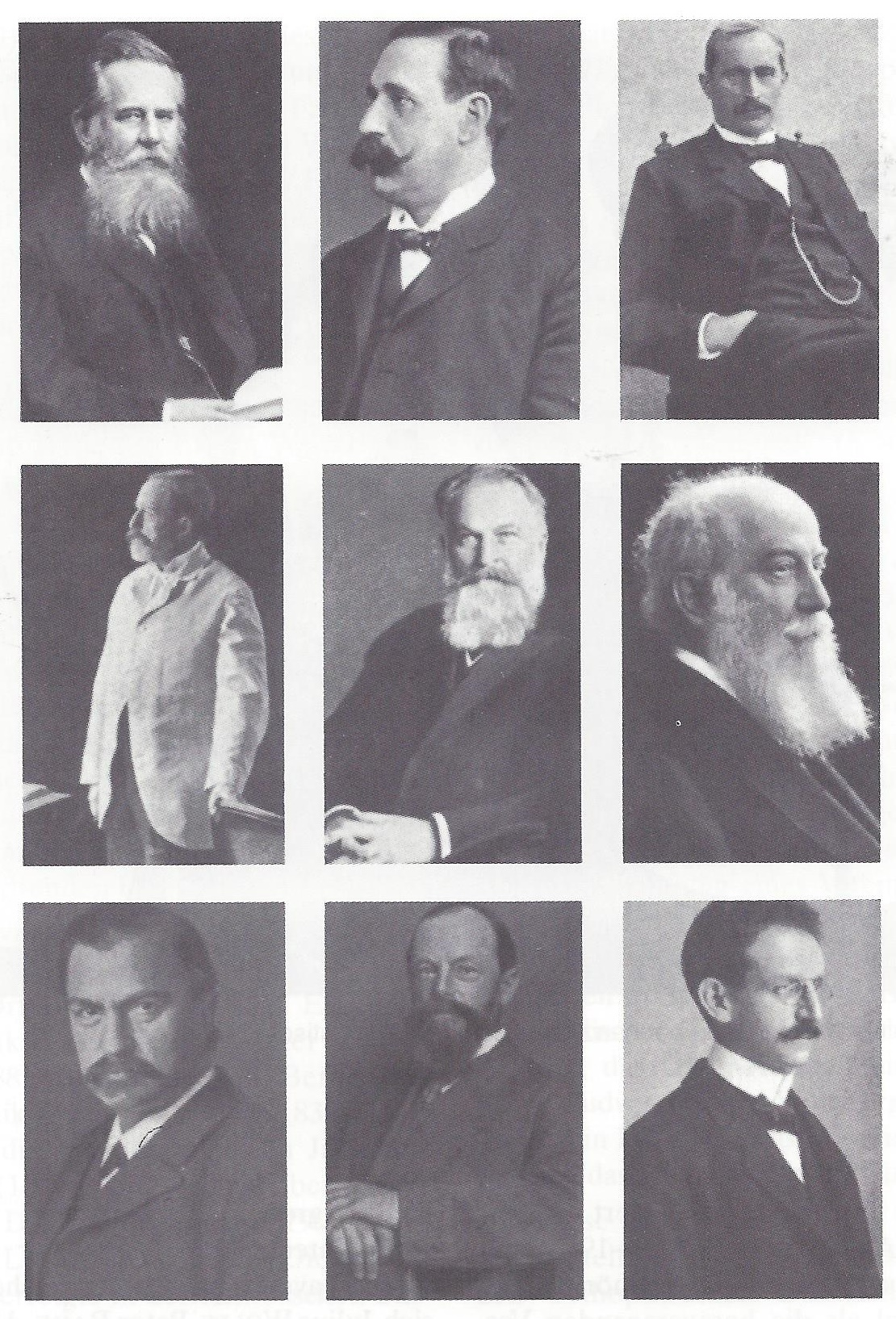
First 9 presidents of the Deutschen Gesellschaft für Orthopädische Chirurgie (l–r): Heinrich Hoeftman (1902), Albert Hoffa (1903), Ludwig Heusner (1904), Johann von Mikulicz (1905), Adolf Lorenz (1906), Bernhard Bardenheuer (1907), Wilhelm Schulthess (1908), Fritz Lange (1909), Georg Joachimsthal (1910).

Bardenheuer specialized in genitourinary surgery, and in 1887 performed the first complete cystectomy. This operation involved a patient who was suffering from an advanced bladder tumour that affected both ureters. The patient died two weeks after the surgery from uremia and hydronephrosis — nevertheless, Bardenheuer was able to prove the technical workability of the surgery. In 1889 Austrian gynecologist Karl Pawlik performed a successful cystectomy on a patient suffering from papillomatosis of the bladder.

In 1909 he performed an autogenous bone graft of the mandible, a procedure that involved replacement of a mandibular condyle with a patient's 4th metatarsal. The "Bardenheuer incision" is named after him, which is a surgical incision used for operative treatment of mastitis. In German medical literature it is referred to as Bardenheuer-Schnitt (Bardenheuer cut) or Bardenheuer-Bogenschnitt (Bardenheuer arc cut).

== Selected publications ==
- Der extraperitoneale Explorativschnitt. Die differentielle Diagnostik der chirurgischen Erkrankungen und Neubildungen des Abdomens, 1887
- Die permanente Extensionsbehandlung : die subcutanen und complicirten Fracturen und Lyxationen der Extremitäten und ihre Folgen, 1889; (The permanent extension treatment: subcutaneous and compound fractures of the extremities and luxations and their consequences).
- Die allgemeine Lehre von den Frakturen und Luxationen mit besonderer Berücksichtigung der Extensionsverfahren (1907); (The general theory of fractures and dislocations, with special consideration given to the extension process).
- Die Technik der Extensionsverbände bei der Behandlung der Frakturen und Luxationen der Extremitäten (published with Rudolf Graessner (1867-1927); (The technique of extension associations in the treatment of fractures and dislocations of the extremities), translated into French and English- 5th edition, 1918)
