= Billroth =

Billroth may refer to:

- Theodor Billroth (1829–1894), Prussian-born Austrian surgeon and amateur musician
- Either of the gastrectomy procedures
  - Billroth I
  - Billroth II
