= Friedrich Paul Reichel =

German surgeon

Friedrich Paul Reichel (born 23 December 1858 in Breslau, died December 1934) was a German surgeon.

1881 - 1885: Assistant (Breslau - Surgery - Fischer)

1882: Doctor of medicine

1885 - 1888: Assistant (Berlin - Gynecology - Karl Ludwig Ernst Schroeder and Robert Michel von Olshausen)

1888 - 1892: Assistant (Würzburg - Surgery - Karl Wilhelm Ernst Joachim Schönborn)

1889: Habilitation in Surgery

1896: Moved to Breslau

== Medical Progress Related ==
- Reichel-Polya Operation: Type of posterior gastroenterostomy that is a modification of the Billroth II operation. Named with Hungarian surgeon, Eugen Pólya (1876-1944)
- Reichel's syndrome: Also known as synovial osteochondromatosis.
