= Finsterer =

Finsterer is a surname. Notable people with the surname include:

- Hans Finsterer (1877–1955), Austrian surgeon
- Jack Finsterer (born 1968), Australian actor
- Mary Finsterer (born 1962), Australian composer and academic
- Rudolf Finsterer (born 1951), German rugby player

== See also ==
- Hofmeister-Finsterer operation
