= Fritz Lange =

Fritz Lange may refer to:

- Fritz Lange (politician) (1898–1981), minister for national education in the German Democratic Republic
- Fritz Lange (surgeon) (1864–1952), German orthopedic surgeon
- Fritz Lange (canoeist) (born 1940), East German slalom canoeist
- Fritz Lange (wrestler) (1885–?), German wrestler

== See also ==
- Fritz Lang (1890–1976), Austrian-German-American filmmaker
- Fritz Lang (artist) (1877–1961), German painter
