= Gastric outlet obstruction =

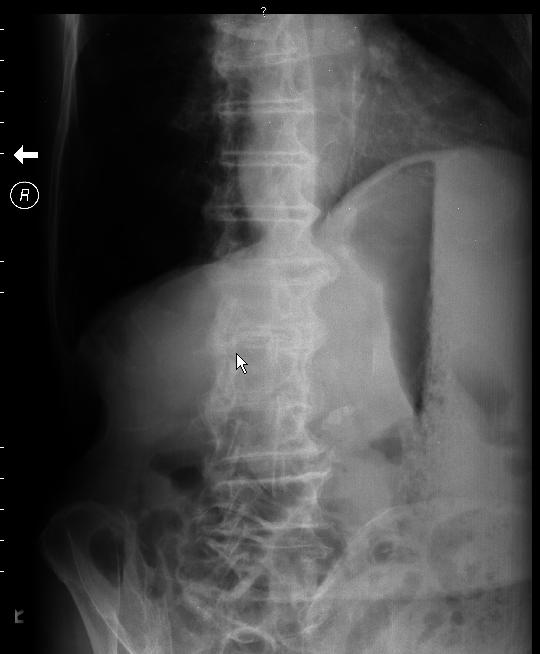
- X-ray of abdomen of a person with gastric outlet obstruction taken while on their side. There is a prominent gastric air bubble, gastric air-fluid level, and a dilated stomach with particulate matter within it.
- Specialty: General surgery, gastroenterology

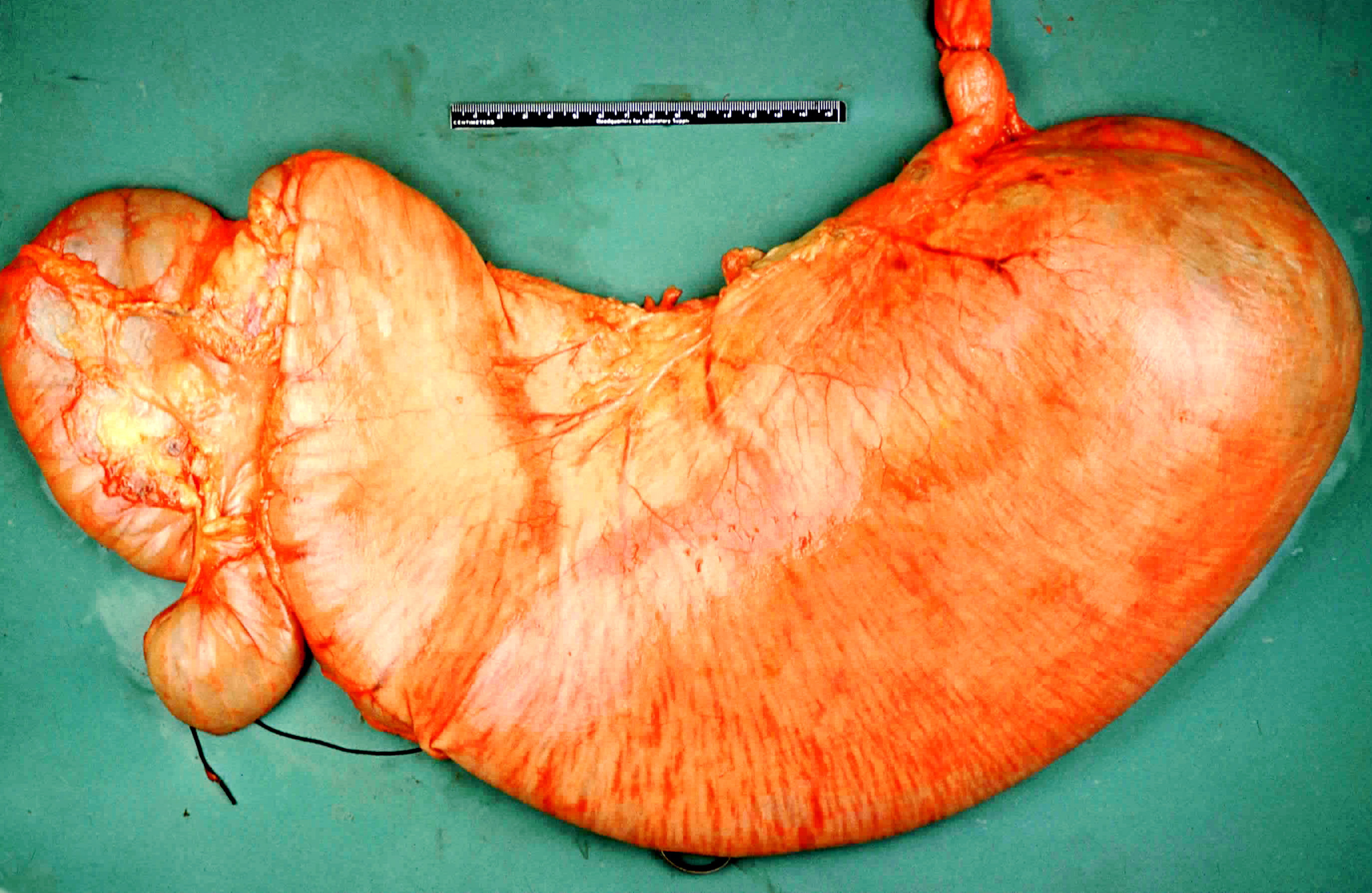
gross stomach dilatation, pyloric obstruction

Gastric outlet obstruction (GOO) is a medical condition where there is an obstruction at the level of the pylorus, which is the outlet of the stomach. Individuals with gastric outlet obstruction will often have recurrent vomiting of food that has accumulated in the stomach, but which cannot pass into the small intestine due to the obstruction. The stomach often dilates to accommodate food intake and secretions. Causes of gastric outlet obstruction include both benign causes, such as peptic ulcer disease affecting the area around the pylorus, and malignant causes, such as gastric cancer.

Causation related to ulcers may involve severe pain, which the patient may interpret as a heart condition or attack.

Treatment of the condition depends upon the underlying cause; it can involve antibiotic treatment when Helicobacter pylori is related to an ulcer, endoscopic therapies (such as dilation of the obstruction with balloons or the placement of self-expandable metallic stents), other medical therapies, or surgery to resolve the obstruction.

== Signs and symptoms ==
The main symptom is vomiting, which typically occurs after meals, of undigested food devoid of any bile. A history of previous peptic ulcers and loss of weight is not uncommon. In advanced cases, signs to look for on physical examination are wasting and dehydration. Visible peristalsis from left to right may be present. Succussion splash is a splash-like sound heard over the stomach in the left upper quadrant of the abdomen on shaking the patient, with or without the stethoscope. Bowel sound may be increased (borborygmi) due to excessive peristaltic action of the stomach. Fullness in the left hypochondrium may also be present.

== Causes ==
The causes are divided into benign or malignant.

- Benign
  - Peptic ulcer disease
  - Infections, such as tuberculosis; and infiltrative diseases, such as amyloidosis.
  - A rare cause of gastric outlet obstruction is blockage with a gallstone, also termed "Bouveret syndrome" or "Bouveret's syndrome".
  - In children, congenital pyloric stenosis / congenital hypertrophic pyloric stenosis may be a cause.
  - A pancreatic pseudocyst can cause gastric compression.
  - Pyloric mucosal diaphragm could be a rare cause.
- Malignant
  - Tumours of the stomach, including adenocarcinoma (and its linitis plastica variant), lymphoma, and gastrointestinal stromal tumours

== Pathophysiology ==
In a peptic ulcer, it is believed to be a result of edema and scarring of the ulcer, followed by healing and fibrosis, which leads to obstruction of the gastroduodenal junction (usually an ulcer in the first part of the duodenum).

== Diagnosis ==
The most confirmatory investigation is an endoscopy of the upper gastrointestinal tract.

Laboratory often find hypochloremic, hypokalemic, and alkalotic due to loss of hydrogen chloride and potassium. High urea and creatinine levels may also be observed if the patient is dehydrated.

An abdominal X-ray may show a gastric fluid level, which would support the diagnosis.

Barium meal and follow-through may show an enlarged stomach and pyloroduodenal stenosis.

Gastroscopy may help with the cause and can be used therapeutically.

=== Differential diagnosis ===
The differential diagnosis of gastric outlet obstruction may include: early gastric carcinoma, hiatal hernia, gastroesophageal reflux, adrenal insufficiency, and inborn errors of metabolism.

== Treatment ==
Treatment of gastric outlet obstruction depends on the cause, but is usually either surgical or medical.

=== Medication ===
In most people with peptic ulcer disease, the oedema will usually settle with conservative management with nasogastric suction, replacement of fluids and electrolytes, and proton pump inhibitors.

=== Surgery ===
Surgery is indicated in cases of gastric outlet obstruction in which there is significant obstruction and in cases where medical therapy has failed. Endoscopic balloon therapy may be attempted as an alternative to surgery, with balloon dilation reporting success rates of 76% after repeat dilatations. The operation usually performed is an antrectomy, the removal of the antral portion of the stomach. Other surgical approaches include: vagotomy, the severing of the vagus nerve, the Billroth I, a procedure which involves anastomosing the duodenum to the distal stomach, or a bilateral truncal vagotomy with gastrojejunostomy.
