= Joint locking =

Joint locking may refer to:

- Performing a joint lock in martial arts or hand-to-hand combat
- Joint locking (medicine)
