= Nausea =

Medical symptom or condition

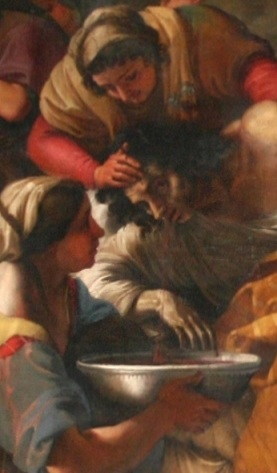
- A 1681 painting depicting a person vomiting
- Specialty: Gastroenterology
- Complications: Vomiting

Nausea is a diffuse sensation of unease and discomfort, sometimes perceived as an urge to vomit. It can be a debilitating symptom if prolonged and has been described as placing discomfort on the chest, abdomen, or back of the throat.

Over 30 definitions of nausea were proposed in a 2011 book on the topic.

Nausea is a non-specific symptom, which means that it has many possible causes. Some common causes of nausea are gastroenteritis and other gastrointestinal disorders, food poisoning, motion sickness, dizziness, migraine, fainting, low blood sugar, anxiety, hyperthermia, dehydration and lack of sleep. Nausea is a side effect of many medications including chemotherapy, or morning sickness in early pregnancy. Nausea may also be caused by disgust and depression.

Medications taken to prevent and treat nausea and vomiting are called antiemetics. The most commonly prescribed antiemetics in the US are promethazine, metoclopramide, and the newer ondansetron. The word nausea is from Latin nausea, from Greek ναυσία – nausia, "ναυτία" – nautia, seasickness, "feeling sick or queasy", from Latin naus, Greek ναος, a ship.

== Causes ==
Gastrointestinal infections (37%) and food poisoning are the two most common causes of acute nausea and vomiting. Side effects from medications (3%) and pregnancy are also relatively frequent. There are many causes of chronic nausea. Nausea and vomiting remain undiagnosed in 10% of the cases. Aside from morning sickness, there are no sex differences in complaints of nausea. After childhood, doctor consultations decrease steadily with age. Only a fraction of one percent of doctor visits by those over 65 are due to nausea in Austraila.

=== Gastrointestinal ===
Gastrointestinal infection is one of the most common causes of acute nausea and vomiting. Chronic nausea may be the presentation of many gastrointestinal disorders, occasionally as the major symptom, such as gastroesophageal reflux disease, functional dyspepsia, gastritis, biliary reflux, gastroparesis, peptic ulcer, celiac disease, non-celiac gluten sensitivity, Crohn's disease, hepatitis, upper gastrointestinal malignancy, and pancreatic cancer. Uncomplicated Helicobacter pylori infection does not cause chronic nausea.

=== Food poisoning ===
Food poisoning usually causes an abrupt onset of nausea and vomiting one to six hours after ingestion of contaminated food and lasts for one to two days. It is due to toxins produced by bacteria in food.

=== Medications ===
Many medications can potentially cause nausea. Some of the most frequently associated include cytotoxic chemotherapy regimens for cancer and other diseases, and general anaesthetic agents. An old cure for migraine, ergotamine, is well known to cause devastating nausea in some patients; a person using it for the first time will be prescribed an antiemetic for relief if needed. Opioids commonly cause nausea too.

=== Pregnancy ===
Nausea or "morning sickness" is common during early pregnancy but may occasionally continue into the second and third trimesters. In the first trimester nearly 80% of women have some degree of nausea. Pregnancy should therefore be considered as a possible cause of nausea in any sexually active woman of child-bearing age. While usually it is mild and self-limiting, severe cases known as hyperemesis gravidarum may require treatment.

=== Disequilibrium ===
A number of conditions involving balance such as motion sickness and vertigo can lead to nausea and vomiting.

=== Gynecologic ===
Dysmenorrhea can cause nausea.

=== Psychiatric ===
Nausea may be caused by depression, anxiety disorders and eating disorders.

=== Potentially serious ===
While most causes of nausea are not serious, some serious conditions are associated with nausea. These include pancreatitis, small bowel obstruction, appendicitis, cholecystitis, hepatitis, Addisonian crisis, diabetic ketoacidosis, increased intracranial pressure, spontaneous intracranial hypotension, brain tumors, meningitis, heart attack, rabies, carbon monoxide poisoning and many others.

=== Comprehensive list ===
==== Inside the abdomen ====
Obstructing disorders

- Gastric outlet obstruction
- Small bowel obstruction
- Colonic obstruction
- Superior mesenteric artery syndrome

Enteric infections

- Viral infection
- Bacterial infection

Inflammatory diseases

- Celiac disease
- Cholecystitis
- Pancreatitis
- Appendicitis
- Hepatitis

Sensorimotor dysfunction

- Gastroparesis
- Intestinal pseudo-obstruction
- Gastroesophageal reflux disease
- Irritable bowel syndrome
- Cyclic vomiting syndrome

Other

- Non-celiac gluten sensitivity
- Biliary colic
- Kidney stone
- Cirrhosis
- Abdominal irradiation

==== Outside the abdomen ====
Cardiopulmonary

- Cardiomyopathy
- Myocardial infarction (heart attack)
- Paroxysmal cough

Inner-ear diseases

- Motion sickness
- Labyrinthitis
- Malignancy

Intracerebral disorders

- Malignancy
- Hemorrhage
- Abscess
- Hydrocephalus
- Meningitis
- Encephalitis
- Rabies

Psychiatric illnesses

- Anorexia and bulimia nervosa
- Depression
- Drug withdrawal

Other

- Post-operative vomiting
- Nociception
- Altitude sickness
- Mast cell activation syndrome

==== Medications and metabolic disorders ====
Drugs

- Chemotherapy
- Antibiotics
- Antiarrhythmics
- Digoxin
- Oral hypoglycemic medications
- Oral contraceptives
- Norepinephrine reuptake inhibitors

Endocrine/metabolic disease

- Pregnancy
- Uremia
- Ketoacidosis
- Thyroid and parathyroid disease
- Adrenal insufficiency

Toxins

- Liver failure
- Alcohol

== Pathophysiology ==
Research on nausea and vomiting has relied on using animal models to mimic the anatomy and neuropharmacologic features of the human body. The physiologic mechanism of nausea is a complex process that has yet to be fully elucidated. There are four general pathways that are activated by specific triggers in the human body that go on to create the sensation of nausea and vomiting.

- Central nervous system (CNS): Stimuli can affect areas of the CNS including the cerebral cortex and the limbic system. These areas are activated by elevated intracranial pressure, irritation of the meninges (i.e. blood or infection), and extreme emotional triggers such as anxiety. The supratentorial region is also responsible for the sensation of nausea.
- Chemoreceptor trigger zone (CTZ): The CTZ is located in the area postrema in the floor of the fourth ventricle within the brain. This area is outside the blood brain barrier, and is therefore readily exposed to substances circulating through the blood and cerebral spinal fluid. Common triggers of the CTZ include metabolic abnormalities, toxins, and medications. Activation of the CTZ is mediated by dopamine (D2) receptors, serotonin (5HT3) receptors, and neurokinin receptors (NK1).
- Vestibular system: This system is activated by disturbances to the vestibular apparatus in the inner ear. These include movements that cause motion sickness and dizziness. This pathway is triggered via histamine (H1) receptors and acetylcholine (ACh) receptors.
- Peripheral Pathways: These pathways are triggered via chemoreceptors and mechanoreceptors in the gastrointestinal tract, as well as other organs such as the heart and kidneys. Common activators of these pathways include toxins present in the gastrointestinal lumen and distension of the gastrointestinal lumen from blockage or dysmotility of the bowels. Signals from these pathways travel via multiple neural tracts including the vagus, glossopharyngeal, splanchnic, and sympathetic nerves.

Signals from any of these pathways then travel to the brainstem, activating several structures including the nucleus of the solitary tract, the dorsal motor nucleus of the vagus, and central pattern generator. These structures go on to signal various downstream effects of nausea and vomiting. The body's motor muscle responses involve halting the muscles of the gastrointestinal tract, and in fact causing reversed propulsion of gastric contents towards the mouth while increasing abdominal muscle contraction. Autonomic effects involve increased salivation and the sensation of feeling faint that often occurs with nausea and vomiting.

=== Pre-nausea pathophysiology ===
It has been described that alterations in heart rate can occur as well as the release of vasopressin from the posterior pituitary.

== Diagnosis ==
=== Patient history ===
Taking a thorough patient history may reveal important clues to the cause of nausea and vomiting. If the patient's symptoms have an acute onset, then drugs, toxins, and infections are likely. In contrast, a long-standing history of nausea will point towards a chronic illness as the culprit. The timing of nausea and vomiting after eating food is an important factor to pay attention to. Symptoms that occur within an hour of eating may indicate an obstruction proximal to the small intestine, such as gastroparesis or pyloric stenosis. An obstruction further down in the intestine or colon will cause delayed vomiting. An infectious cause of nausea and vomiting such as gastroenteritis may present several hours to days after the food was ingested. The contents of the emesis is a valuable clue towards determining the cause. Bits of fecal matter in the emesis indicate obstruction in the distal intestine or the colon. Emesis that is of a bilious nature (greenish in color) localizes the obstruction to a point past the stomach. Emesis of undigested food points to an obstruction prior to the gastric outlet, such as achalasia or Zenker's diverticulum. If patient experiences reduced abdominal pain after vomiting, then obstruction is a likely etiology. However, vomiting does not relieve the pain brought on by pancreatitis or cholecystitis.

=== Physical exam ===
It is important to watch out for signs of dehydration, such as orthostatic hypotension and loss of skin turgor. Auscultation of the abdomen can produce several clues to the cause of nausea and vomiting. A high-pitched tinkling sound indicates possible bowel obstruction, while a splashing "succussion" sound is more indicative of gastric outlet obstruction. Eliciting pain on the abdominal exam when pressing on the patient may indicate an inflammatory process. Signs such as papilledema, visual field losses, or focal neurological deficits are red flag signs for elevated intracranial pressure.

=== Diagnostic testing ===
When a history and physical exam are not enough to determine the cause of nausea and vomiting, certain diagnostic tests may prove useful. A chemistry panel would be useful for electrolyte and metabolic abnormalities. Liver function tests and lipase would identify pancreaticobiliary diseases. Abdominal X-rays showing air-fluid levels indicate bowel obstruction, while an X-ray showing air-filled bowel loops are more indicative of ileus. More advanced imaging and procedures may be necessary, such as a CT scan, upper endoscopy, colonoscopy, barium enema, or MRI. Abnormal GI motility can be assessed using specific tests like gastric scintigraphy, wireless motility capsules, and small-intestinal manometry.

== Treatment ==
If dehydration is present due to loss of fluids from severe vomiting, rehydration with oral electrolyte solutions is preferred. If this is not effective or possible, intravenous rehydration may be required. Medical care is recommended if: a person cannot keep any liquids down, has symptoms more than 2 days, is weak, has a fever, has stomach pain, vomits more than two times in a day or does not urinate for more than 8 hours.

=== Medications ===
Numerous pharmacologic medications are available for the treatment of nausea. There is no medication that is clearly superior to other medications for all cases of nausea. The choice of antiemetic medication may be based on the situation during which the person experiences nausea. For people with motion sickness and vertigo, antihistamines and anticholinergics such as meclizine and scopolamine are particularly effective. Nausea and vomiting associated with migraine headaches respond best to dopamine antagonists such as metoclopramide, prochlorperazine, and chlorpromazine. In cases of gastroenteritis, serotonin antagonists such as ondansetron were found to suppress nausea and vomiting, as well as reduce the need for IV fluid resuscitation. The combination of pyridoxine and doxylamine is the first line treatment for pregnancy-related nausea and vomiting. Dimenhydrinate is an inexpensive and effective over the counter medication for preventing postoperative nausea and vomiting. Other factors to consider when choosing an antiemetic medication include the person's preference, side-effect profile, and cost.

Nabilone is also indicated for this purpose.

=== Alternative medicine ===
In certain people, cannabinoids may be effective in reducing chemotherapy associated nausea and vomiting. Several studies have demonstrated the therapeutic effects of cannabinoids for nausea and vomiting in the advanced stages of illnesses such as cancer and AIDS.

In hospital settings topical anti-nausea gels are not indicated because of lack of research backing their efficacy. Topical gels containing lorazepam, diphenhydramine, and haloperidol are sometimes used for nausea but are not equivalent to more established therapies.

Ginger has also been shown to be potentially effective in treating several types of nausea.

== Prognosis ==
The outlook depends on the cause. Most people recover within few hours or a day. While short-term nausea and vomiting are generally harmless, they may sometimes indicate a more serious condition. When associated with prolonged vomiting, it may lead to dehydration or dangerous electrolyte imbalances or both. Repeated intentional vomiting, characteristic of bulimia, can cause stomach acid to wear away at the enamel present on the teeth.

== Epidemiology ==
Nausea and or vomiting is the main complaint in 1.6% of visits to family physicians in Australia. However, only 25% of people with nausea visit their family physician. In Australia, nausea, as opposed to vomiting, occurs most frequently in persons aged 15–24 years, and is less common in other age groups.

== See also ==
- Cancer and nausea
- Vasodilation
