= Retained antrum syndrome =

- Other names: Retained gastric antrum syndrome
- Specialty: Gastroenterology, Surgery

Retained antrum syndrome or retained gastric antrum syndrome is one of the rare postgastrectomy syndromes. It happens after Billroth II surgery and the mechanism involved is the inadequate removal of the distal antrum and pylorus during resection of the antrum and gastrojejunostomy.

Lack of the usual acid-secreting gastric glands makes the antral segment continually exposed to the alkaline environment of the duodenum, which causes it to secrete excessive acid and be prone to form ulcers.
