= HeavyWeight Yoga =

Yoga designed for obese people

HeavyWeight Yoga is a style of yoga practice designed for obese men and women. The practice uses modifications of yoga's 24 foundational yoga poses, accompanied by a customized use of supportive language. HeavyWeight students employ props to support obese and overweight bodies. These props can include blocks, chairs and other devices to accommodate for the extra body weight, weaker joints and diminished strength of the obese. HeavyWeight Yoga's practice uses classroom lessons, yoga teacher training, and instructional DVDs for overweight and obese people which have been created by the founder of the style, Abby Lentz.

The practice of HeavyWeight Yoga relies upon slower pacing to encourage those who practice it. It avoids classic full inversion poses, modifying them so larger people can practice yoga. It is also appropriate for beginners of anyone who has a limited range of motion.

HeavyWeight Yoga does not include practices which enable students to lose weight. The language of the practice such as "belly well" or "energetic swipe" is designed to create yoga experience for obese people.

== Techniques ==
Two unique techniques of HeavyWeight Yoga are movements to help a student regain flexibility. One of the modifications, the Belly Well, separates the legs to create a space for the body. The modification allows the student to lengthen their spine deeper or more stretch their hamstrings more fully. It can also be combined with an “Energetic Swipe,” which moves the flesh out of the way. This enables an obese yoga student to lower a forward bend or to deepen a twist.

Modifications in HeavyWeight Yoga have been customized by certified teachers in order to accommodate students recovering from surgeries such as joint replacements.

=== Origins ===
Abby Lentz began practicing yoga in the 1970s. She is a trained Kripalu teacher. Lentz started her yoga teaching practice in 2004 and developed HeavyWeight Yoga the same year.

=== Later development ===
Research by the University of Pennsylvania's School of Medicine showed that when a group of obese women over age 50 practiced yoga for eight weeks, each experienced a 39 to 47% reduction in pain and stiffness while treating osteoarthritis in their knees.

In the documentary All of Me, a movie about Weight Loss Surgery patients that aired as part of the PBS Independent Lens series, HeavyWeight Yoga poses are taught in a class of WLS patients to aid in recovery and post-surgical lifestyle. Lentz spoke on a KLRU-TV Civic Summit panel after the movie was broadcast, to explain how yoga affects the obese and overweight student's recovery. The practices of Heavyweight Yoga are a focus of an Independent Lens Short, included with All of Me's documentary's PBS package.

HeavyWeight Yoga instruction is taught to professionals at the Children's Medical Center of Dallas, in support of the hospital's childhood obesity program.

== Notes ==
Pilarzyk, Tom (2008). Yoga Beyond Fitness. Quest Books. ISBN 978-0-8356-0863-3.
