= Joachimsthal =

Joachimsthal, sometimes spelled Joachimstal, may refer to:

== Places ==
- Joachimsthal, Bohemia, former name of Jáchymov, Czechia, famous for its silver and uranium mines and which gave its name to the Joachimsthaler currency
- Joachimsthal, Brandenburg, a town in the Barnim district in the Brandenburg province, Germany
  - Joachimsthal (Amt), the corresponding local administrative district
- Joachimsthalsches Gymnasium, a boarding school originally established in Joachimsthal, Brandenburg
- Joachimstal, now Joaoru, a subsidiary manor on the Joala estate in the Vaivara parish of Virumaa, Estonia

== People ==
- Ferdinand Joachimsthal (1818–1861), Silesian-German mathematician
- Georg Joachimsthal (1863–1914), German physician
