= Eugen Pólya =

Hungarian surgeon (1876–1944)

Jenő Sándor Pólya, German: Eugen Alexander Pólya, Hungarian: Pólya (Pollák) Jenő Sándor (April 30, 1876 – 1944) was a Hungarian surgeon who was a native of Budapest. He was the brother of George Pólya (1887–1985), who was a professor of mathematics at Stanford University.

He studied in Budapest, and in 1898 earned his medical doctorate. In 1909 he was habilitated for surgical anatomy at Budapest, attaining the title of professor of 1914. Reportedly, he was murdered by the Nazis during the Siege of Budapest, although his body was never recovered.

Jenö Pólya is remembered for a surgical procedure known as the "Reichel-Pólya operation", a type of posterior gastroenterostomy that is a modification of the Billroth II operation. The operation is named in conjunction with German surgeon Friedrich Paul Reichel (1858–1934).

Between World War I and World War II, he was visited in Budapest by several American surgeons who came to observe his surgical technique. Consequently, in 1939, Pólya was elected an honorary member of the American College of Surgeons.
