= Range of motion =

Linear or angular distance that an object can move while attached to another

Range of motion (or ROM) is the linear or angular distance that a moving object may normally travel while properly attached to another.

In biomechanics and strength training, ROM refers to the angular distance and direction a joint can move between the flexed position and the extended position. The act of attempting to increase this distance through therapeutic exercises (range of motion therapy—stretching from flexion to extension for physiological gain) is also sometimes called range of motion.

In mechanical engineering, it is (also called range of travel or ROT) used particularly when talking about mechanical devices, such as a sound volume control knob.

== In biomechanics ==
=== Measuring range of motion ===
Each specific joint has a normal range of motion that is expressed in degrees. The reference values for the normal ROM in individuals differ slightly depending on age and sex. For example, as an individual ages, they typically lose a small amount of ROM.

Analog and traditional devices to measure range of motion in the joints of the body include the goniometer and inclinometer which use a stationary arm, protractor, fulcrum, and movement arm to measure angle from axis of the joint. As measurement results will vary by the degree of resistance, two levels of range of motion results are recorded in most cases.

Recent technological advances in 3D motion capture technology allow for the measurement of joints concurrently, which can be used to measure a patient's active range of motion.

=== Limited range of motion ===
Limited range of motion refers to a joint that has a reduction in its ability to move. The reduced motion may be a problem with the specific joint or it may be caused by injury or diseases such as osteoarthritis, rheumatoid arthritis, or other types of arthritis. Pain, swelling, and stiffness associated with arthritis can limit the range of motion of a particular joint and impair function and the ability to perform usual daily activities.

Limited range of motion can affect extension or flexion. If there is limited range of extension, it is called "flexion contracture" or "flexion deformity". If the flexion is deficient, it is called "limited range of flexion" or "limited flexion range".

==== Range of motion exercises ====
Physical and occupational therapy can help to improve joint function by focusing on range of motion exercises. The goal of these exercises is to gently increase range of motion while decreasing pain, swelling, and stiffness. There are three types of range of motion exercises:

- Passive range of motion (or PROM) – Therapist or equipment moves the joint through the range of motion with no effort from the patient.
- Active assisted range of motion (or AAROM) – Patient uses the muscles surrounding the joint to perform the exercise but requires some help from the therapist or equipment (such as a strap).
- Active range of motion (or AROM) – Patient performs the exercise to move the joint without any assistance to the muscles surrounding the joint.

== See also ==
- Joint locking (symptom)
- Hypermobility
