= Portal hypertensive gastropathy =

Changes in the mucosa of the stomach in patients with portal hypertension

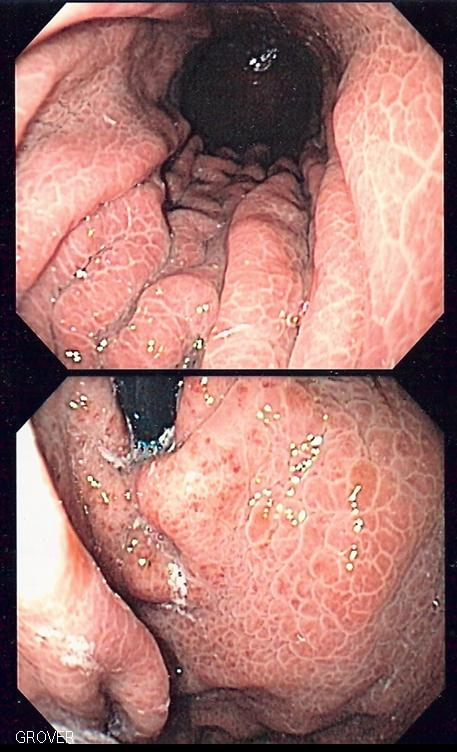
- Image of portal hypertensive gastropathy seen on endoscopy of the stomach. The normally smooth mucosa of the stomach has developed a mosaic like appearance, that resembles snake-skin.
- Specialty: Gastroenterology

Portal hypertensive gastropathy refers to changes in the mucosa of the stomach in patients with portal hypertension; by far the most common cause of this is cirrhosis of the liver. These changes in the mucosa include friability of the mucosa and the presence of ectatic blood vessels at the surface. Patients with portal hypertensive gastropathy may experience bleeding from the stomach, which may uncommonly manifest itself in vomiting blood or melena; however, portal hypertension may cause several other more common sources of upper gastrointestinal bleeding, such as esophageal varices and gastric varices. On endoscopic evaluation of the stomach, this condition shows a characteristic mosaic or "snake-skin" appearance to the mucosa of the stomach.

== Signs and symptoms ==
Most patients with portal hypertensive gastropathy have either a stable or improving course in the appearance of the gastropathy on endoscopy. However, according to retrospective data, roughly one in seven patients with portal hypertensive gastropathy will develop bleeding (either acute or chronic) attributable to the gastropathy. Patients with chronic bleeding will usually present with anemia.

The diagnosis of portal hypertensive gastropathy is usually made on endoscopy. The usual appearance of portal hypertensive gastropathy on endoscopy is a mosaic-like or reticular pattern in the mucosa. Red spots may or may not be present. The pattern is usually seen throughout the stomach. A similar pattern can be seen with a related condition called gastric antral vascular ectasia (GAVE), or watermelon stomach. However, in GAVE, the ectatic blood vessels are more commonly found in the antrum or lower part of the stomach.

== Pathogenesis ==
Several studies have found that patients with portal hypertension develop increased blood flow to the stomach. The physiological findings that correlate with worsening portal hypertensive gastropathy include an increased portal venous pressure gradient and decreased hepatic blood flow. Biopsies of the stomach in patients with portal hypertensive gastropathy show ectatic (or dilated) blood vessels, evidence of bleeding by means of red blood cells in the lamina propria, and edema in the stomach wall.

== Treatment ==
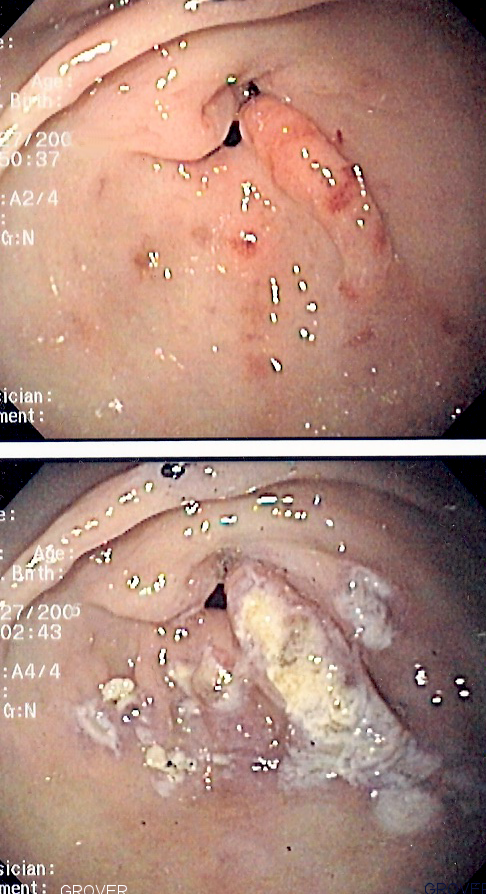
Argon plasma coagulation, seen here to treat gastric antral vascular ectasia, has also been used to treat bleeding from portal hypertensive gastropathy

=== Medications ===
Several treatment options have been developed for portal hypertensive gastropathy. The first is the use of beta-blockers, which reduce portal pressures. Non-selective beta blockers (such as propranolol and nadolol) have been used to decrease the pressure of the portal vein in patients with esophageal varices, and have been shown to regress portal hypertensive gastropathy that has been worsened by medical treatment of varices. Propranolol has also been evaluated in patients with chronic cirrhosis and portal hypertensive gastropathy. Other medications that primarily treat bleeding, including anti-fibrinolytic medications such as tranexamic acid have also been used in case reports of patients with portal hypertensive gastropathy. These medications work by stabilizing deposits of fibrin at sites that ordinarily would bleed.

Finally, octreotide, an analogue of somatostatin that leads to vasoconstriction of the portal circulation, can be used for active bleeding due to portal hypertensive gastropathy. Sucralfate, a coating medication has also been used, but evidence is from animal models.

=== Procedural ===
Portal hypertensive gastropathy can also be treated with endoscopic treatment delivered through a fibre-optic camera into the stomach. Argon plasma coagulation and electrocautery have both been used to stop bleeding from ectatic vessels, and to attempt to obliterate the vessels, but have limited utility if the disease is diffuse.

Transjugular intrahepatic portosystemic shunt procedures, or TIPS involve decompressing the portal vein by shunting a portal venule to a lower pressure systemic venule, under guidance with fluoroscopy. Since it treats the root cause of portal hypertension gastropathy, it has been putatively used for the condition. The literature reports suggest both regression of portal hypertensive gastropathy on endoscopic images and improvement in bleeding after TIPS.

Finally, cryotherapy involves the use of pressurized carbon dioxide administered through the endoscope to freeze and destroy tissue in a focal area. It is being studied for the treatment of portal hypertensive gastropathy.

== Similar conditions ==
Congestion of the mucosa in other parts of the gastrointestinal tract can also be seen in portal hypertension. When the condition involves the colon, it is termed portal hypertensive colopathy.
