= Hofmeister–Finsterer operation =

Medical Operation

- Specialty: Gastroenterology

The Hofmeister–Finsterer operation is a partial gastrectomy, devised by Franz von Hofmeister, based upon a procedure by Eugen Pólya. It was later refined by Hans Finsterer and became known as the Hofmeister–Finsterer gastrectomy. Here upper part of the cut end of the stomach is closed and remaining lower portion is anastomosed with jejunum.
