= Stump blow-out =

Type of leakage of the duodenum

Stump blow-out, or duodenal blow-out, is the leakage of the blind end of the duodenum. It occurs as a complication of Billroth II gastrectomy, usually on the fourth or fifth day after surgery. It is due to improper closure of duodenal stump, especially when the duodenum is inflamed and oedematous. It can also occur because of afferent loop block, local pancreatitis and distal obstruction. The patient who was previously convalescing satisfactorily may suddenly present with severe abdominal pain, fever and shock-like state. Jaundice may develop within 48 hours owing to the absorption of bile from peritoneal cavity. If the abdomen is drained, bile-stained fluid may be seen emerging at the drain site.

== See also ==
- Roux-en-Y anastomosis
