= Heinrich Hoeftman =

German physician (1851–1917)

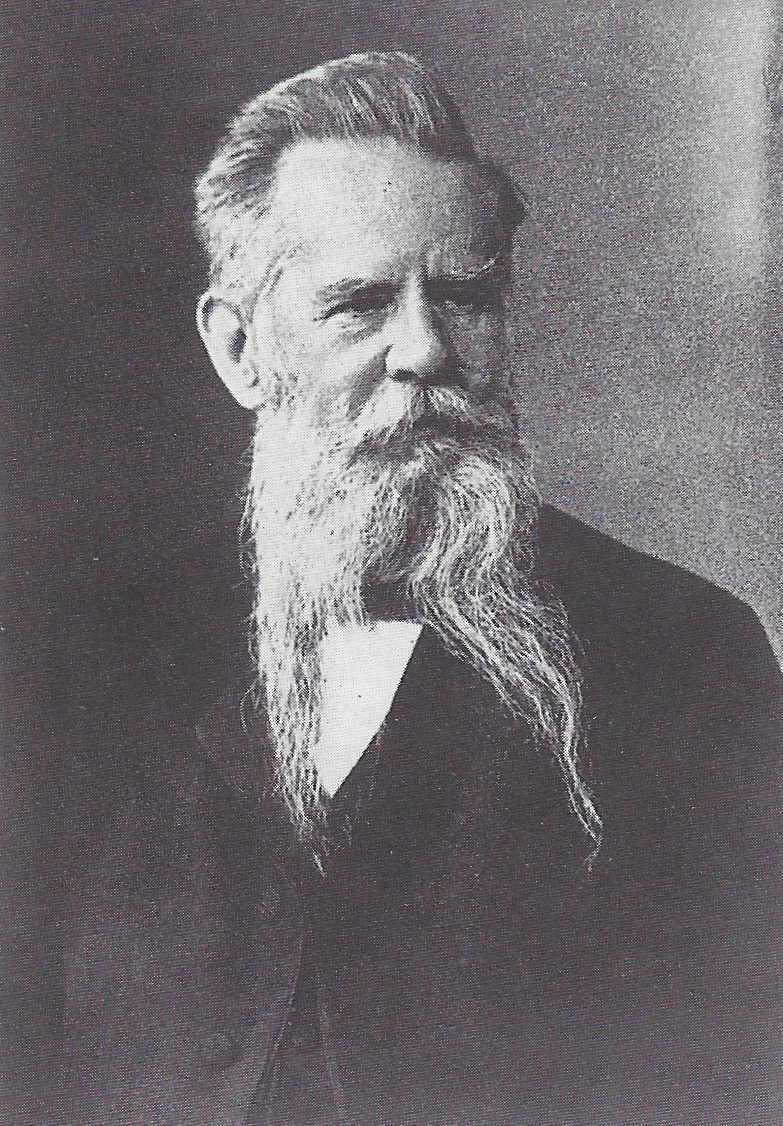
Heinrich Hoeftman (ca. 1910)

Heinrich Hoeftman (2 April 1851, in Memel – 17 September 1917, in Königsberg) was a German physician. He is regarded as a pioneer of modern German orthopedics.

He studied medicine for one semester at the University of Leipzig, then served as a volunteer in the Franco-Prussian War. In 1871, he resumed his studies at the University of Königsberg, receiving his doctorate in 1876 with the thesis "Ueber Ganglien und chronisch fungöse Sehnenscheiden-Entzündung". Following graduation, he worked for several months under surgeon Theodor Billroth at Vienna, then returned to Königsberg as an assistant to Karl Schönborn at the university hospital.

In 1880, he opened his own medical practice in Königsberg, and two years later took charge of a private clinic that eventually included an orthopedic workshop, a gymnastic institution and a modern orthopedic hospital with 120 beds. As a physician, he specialized in lower limb prosthesis.

In 1901, he was a founding member of the Deutschen Orthopädischen Gesellschaft (German Orthopedic Society), and in 1910 became a professor of orthopedics at the University of Königsberg. During World War I he served on the orthopedic advisory board of the First Army Corps.
