= Gastric antral vascular ectasia =

Intestinal bleeding due to widening of blood vessels in the stomach

- Other names: Watermelon stomach, watermelon disease
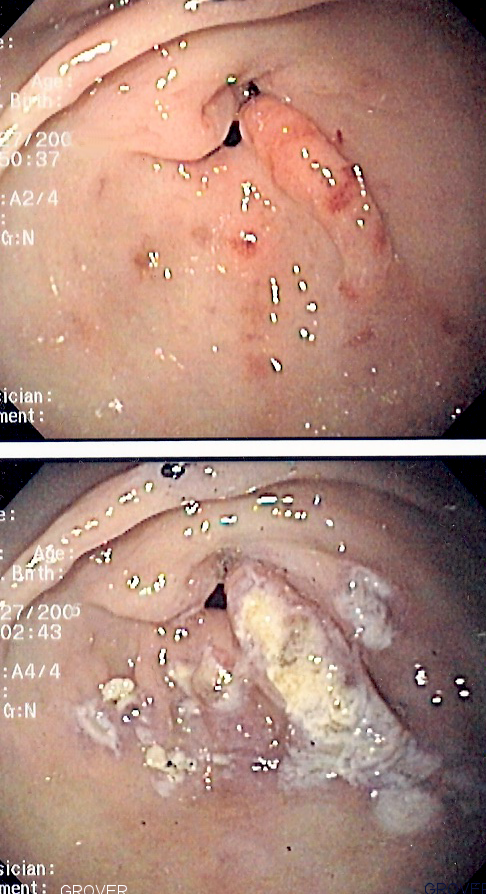
- Endoscopic image of gastric antral vascular ectasia seen as a radial pattern around the pylorus before (top) and after (bottom) treatment with argon plasma coagulation
- Specialty: Gastroenterology
- Symptoms: Bleeding in the stomach and intestines, edema, dilated blood vessels

Gastric antral vascular ectasia (GAVE) is an uncommon cause of chronic gastrointestinal bleeding or iron deficiency anemia. The condition is associated with dilated small blood vessels in the gastric antrum, which is a distal part of the stomach. The dilated vessels result in intestinal bleeding. It is also called watermelon stomach because streaky long red areas that are present in the stomach may resemble the markings on watermelon.

The condition was first discovered in 1952, and reported in the literature in 1953. Watermelon disease was first diagnosed by Wheeler et al. in 1979, and definitively described in four living patients by Jabbari et al. only in 1984. As of 2011, the cause and pathogenesis are still not known. However, there are several competing hypotheses as to various causes.

== Signs and symptoms ==
Most patients who are eventually diagnosed with watermelon stomach come to a physician complaining of anemia and blood loss. Sometimes, a patient may come to the physician because he or she notices blood in the stools—either melena (black and tarry stools) and/or hematochezia (red bloody stools).

== Cause ==
The literature, from 1953 through 2010, often cited that the cause of gastric antral vascular ectasia is unknown. The causal connection between cirrhosis and GAVE has not been proven. A connective tissue disease has been suspected in some cases.

There may be an association between autoimmunnity and GAVE, as 25% of all sclerosis patients with antibodies to anti-RNA polymerase III have GAVE. RNA autoimmunity has been suspected as a cause or marker since at least 1996. Gastrin levels may indicate a hormonal connection.

=== Associated conditions ===
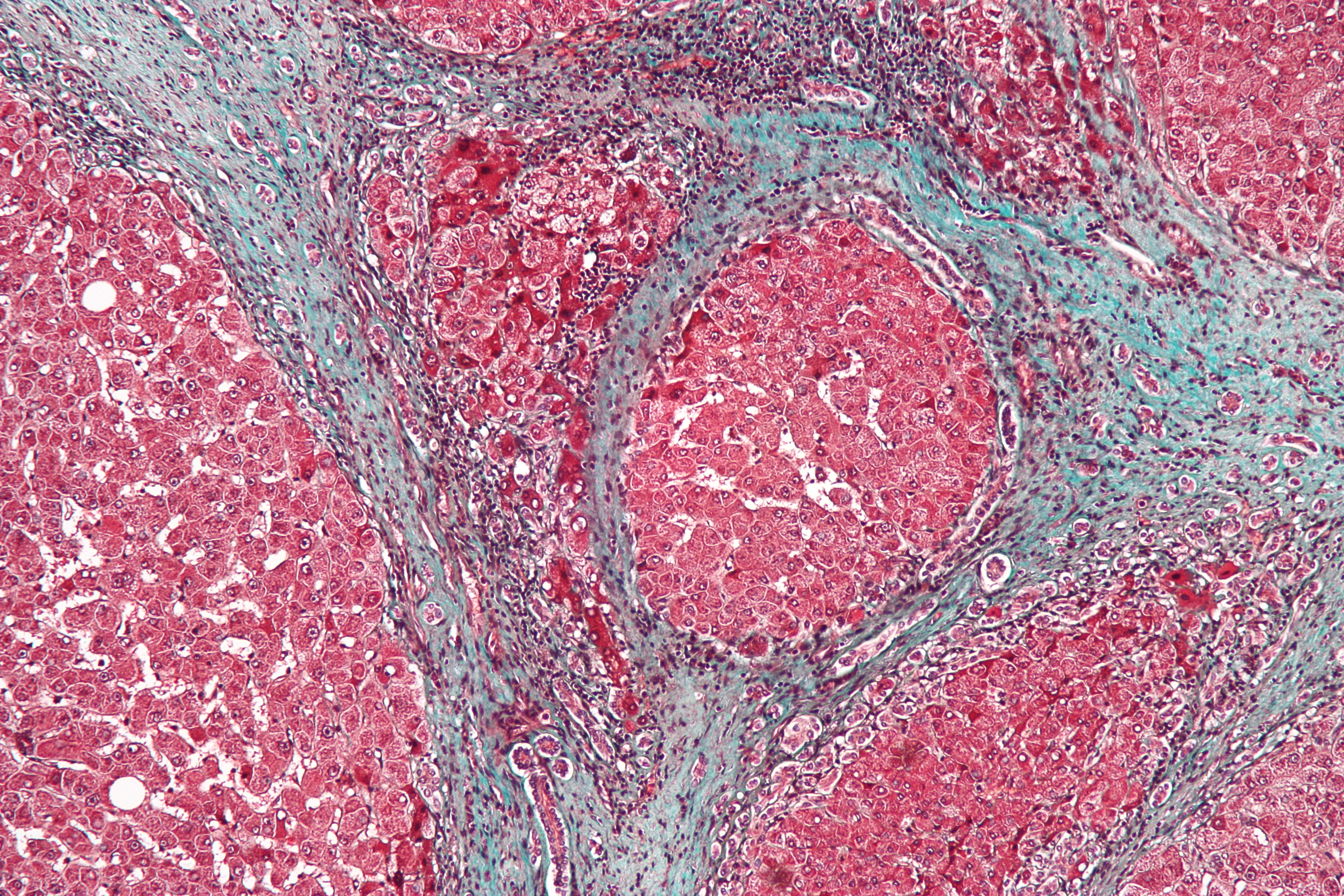
Micrograph showing liver cirrhosis, a condition that often precedes hepatic encephalopathy. Trichrome stain.

GAVE is associated with a number of conditions, including portal hypertension, chronic kidney failure, and collagen vascular diseases.

Watermelon stomach also occurs particularly with scleroderma, and especially the subtype known as systemic sclerosis. A full 5.7% of persons with sclerosis have GAVE, and 25% of all sclerosis patients who have a certain anti-RNA polymerase marker have GAVE. In fact:

Most patients with GAVE suffer from liver cirrhosis, autoimmune disease, chronic kidney failure and bone marrow transplantation. The typical initial presentations range from occult bleeding causing transfusion-dependent chronic iron-deficiency anemia to severe acute gastrointestinal bleeding.

— Masae Komiyama, et al., 2010.

The endoscopic appearance of GAVE is similar to portal hypertensive gastropathy, but is not the same condition, and may be concurrent with cirrhosis of the liver. 30% of all patients have cirrhosis associated with GAVE.

Sjögren's syndrome has been associated with at least one patient.

The first case of ectopic pancreas associated with watermelon stomach was reported in 2010.

Patients with GAVE may have elevated gastrin levels.

The Genetic and Rare Diseases Information Center (GARD) states that pernicious anemia is one of the conditions associated with GAVE, and one separate study showed that over three-fourths of the patients in the study with GAVE had some kind of vitamin B_{12} deficiency including the associated condition pernicious anemia.

== Pathogenesis ==
GAVE is characterized by dilated capillaries in the lamina propria with fibrin thrombi. The main histomorphologic differential diagnosis is portal hypertension, which is often apparent from clinical findings.

Research in 2010 has shown that anti-RNA polymerase III antibodies may be used as a risk marker for GAVE in systemic sclerosis patients.

== Diagnosis ==
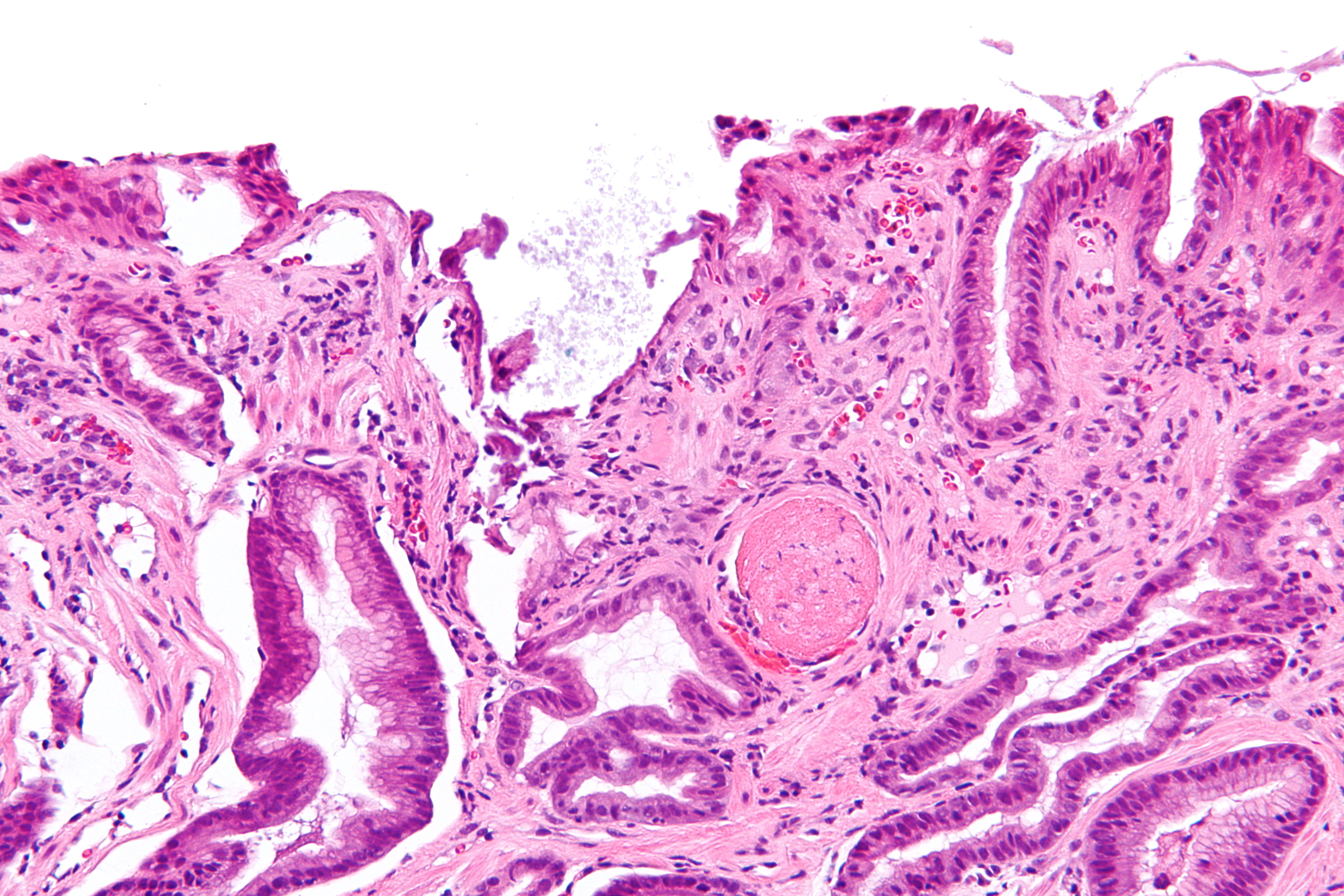
Micrograph showing gastric antral vascular ectasia. A large spherical, eosinophilic (i.e. pink) fibrin thrombus is seen off-center right. Stomach biopsy. H&E stain.

GAVE is usually diagnosed definitively by means of an endoscopic biopsy. The tell-tale watermelon stripes show up during the endoscopy.

Surgical exploration of the abdomen may be needed to diagnose some cases, especially if the liver or other organs are involved.

=== Differential diagnosis ===
GAVE results in intestinal bleeding similar to duodenal ulcers and portal hypertension. The GI bleeding can result in anemia. It is often overlooked, but can be more common in elderly patients. It has been seen in a female patient of 26 years of age.

Watermelon stomach has a different etiology and has a differential diagnosis from portal hypertension. In fact, cirrhosis and portal hypertension may be missing in a patient with GAVE. The differential diagnosis is important because treatments are different.

== Treatment ==
=== Traditional treatments ===
Treatment of GAVE can be categorized into endoscopic, surgical and pharmacologic therapies. GAVE is treated commonly by means of an endoscope, including argon plasma coagulation (APC) and electrocautery. APC is well tolerated but "tends to induce oozing and bleeding." "Endoscopy with thermal ablation" is a favored medical treatment because of its low side effects and low mortality, but is "rarely curative." Surgical treatment is definitive but it is rarely done nowadays with the variety of treatment options available. Some of the discussed modalities have been used in GAVE patients with another underlying disease rather than SSc; they are included as they may be tried in resistant SSc-GAVE patients. Symptomatic treatment includes iron supplementation and blood transfusion for cases with severe anemia; proton pump inhibitors may ameliorate the background chronic gastritis and minute erosions that commonly co-existed in biopsy reports.

=== Medications ===
Other medical treatments have been tried and include estrogen and progesterone therapy, Corticosteroids are effective, but are "limited by their side effects."

=== Treatment of co-morbid conditions ===
A transjugular intrahepatic portosystemic shunt (TIPS or TIPSS) procedure is used to treat portal hypertension when that is present as an associated condition. Unfortunately, the TIPSS, which has been used for similar conditions, may cause or exacerbate hepatic encephalopathy. TIPSS-related encephalopathy occurs in about 30% of cases, with the risk being higher in those with previous episodes of encephalopathy, higher age, female sex, and liver disease due to causes other than alcohol. The patient, with their physician and family, must balance out a reduction in bleeding caused by TIPS with the significant risk of encephalopathy. Various shunts have been shown in a meta-study of 22 studies to be effective treatment to reduce variceal bleeding, yet none have any demonstrated survival advantage.

If there is cirrhosis of the liver that has progressed to liver failure, then lactulose may be prescribed for hepatic encephalopathy, especially for Type C encephalopathy with diabetes. Also, "antibiotics such as neomycin, metronidazole, and rifaximin" may be used effectively to treat the encephalopathy by removing nitrogen-producing bacteria from the gut.

Paracentesis, a medical procedure involving needle drainage of fluid from a body cavity, may be used to remove fluid from the peritoneal cavity in the abdomen for such cases.

=== Surgery ===
Surgery, consisting of excision of part of the lower stomach, also called antrectomy, is another option. Antrectomy is "the resection, or surgical removal, of a part of the stomach known as the antrum". Laparoscopic surgery is possible in some cases, and as of 2003, was a "novel approach to treating watermelon stomach".

A treatment used sometimes is endoscopic band ligation.

In 2010, a team of Japanese surgeons performed a "novel endoscopic ablation of gastric antral vascular ectasia". The experimental procedure resulted in "no complications".

Relapse is possible, even after treatment by argon plasma coagulation and progesterone.

Antrectomy or other surgery is used as a last resort for GAVE.

== Epidemiology ==
The average age of diagnosis for GAVE is 73 years of age for females, and 68 for males. Women are about twice as often diagnosed with gastric antral vascular ectasia than men. 71% of all cases of GAVE are diagnosed in females. Patients in their thirties have been found to have GAVE. It becomes more common in women in their eighties, rising to 4% of all such gastrointestinal conditions.

5.7% of all sclerosis patients (and 25% of those who had a certain anti-RNA marker) have GAVE.
