= Nerve of Latarjet =

Branch of the vagus nerve

The nerve of Latarjet or the posterior nerve of the lesser curvature is a branch of the posterior vagal trunk which supplies the pylorus. It is cut in selective vagotomy and preserved in highly selective vagotomy. It functions by increasing peristalsis and relaxing the sphincter, thus draining the contents of the stomach into the first part of duodenum. If damage occurs to this nerve, it can cause retention syndrome.
