= Vagotomy =

Surgical procedure

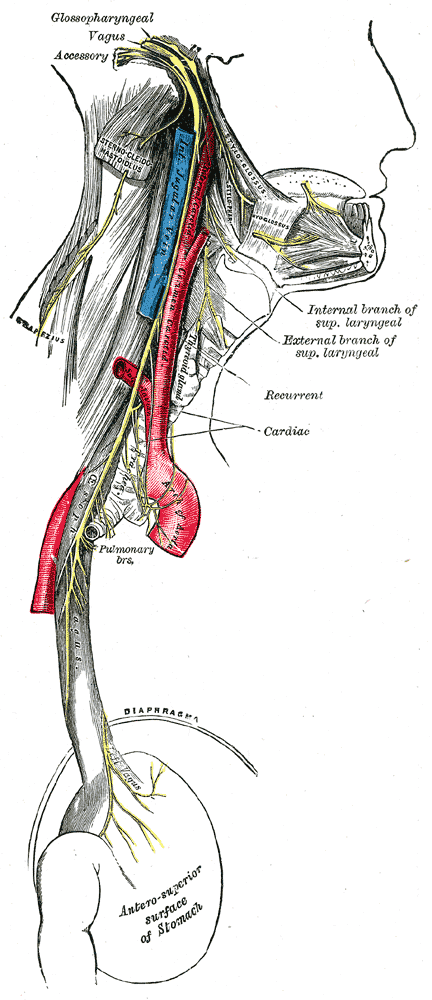
- Course and distribution of the glossopharyngeal, vagus, and accessory nerves.
- ICD-9-CM: 44.0
- MeSH: D014628

A vagotomy is a surgical procedure that involves removing part of the vagus nerve. It is performed in the abdomen.

== Types ==
A plain vagotomy eliminates afferent and parasympathetic innervation of the stomach and the left side of the transverse colon. Other techniques focus on branches leading from the retroperitoneum to the stomach.

Highly selective vagotomy refers to denervation of only those branches supplying the lower esophagus and stomach (leaving the nerve of Latarjet in place to ensure the emptying function of the stomach remains intact). It is one of the treatments of peptic ulcer.

Vagotomy can be used in the surgical management of peptic (duodenal and gastric) ulcer disease (PUD). Vagotomy was once commonly performed to treat and prevent PUD; however, with the availability of excellent acid secretion control with H2 receptor antagonists, such as cimetidine, ranitidine, and famotidine, and proton pump inhibitors (PPIs), such as pantoprazole, rabeprazole, omeprazole, and lansoprazole, the need for surgical management of peptic ulcer disease has greatly decreased.

The basic types of vagotomy are:

- Truncal vagotomy (TV) includes division of the main trunk of the vagus (including its celiac/hepatic branch) and denervation of the pylorus; therefore, a pyloric drainage procedure, such as pyloric dilatation or disruption (pyloromyotomy or pyloroplasty) or gastrojejunostomy, is needed. This procedure also denervates the liver, biliary tree, pancreas, and small and large bowel.
- Highly selective vagotomy includes denervation of only the fundus and body (parietal cell-containing areas) of the stomach (also called parietal cell vagotomy). It preserves the nerve supply of the antrum and pylorus; a pyloric drainage procedure is not needed. It does not denervate the liver, biliary tree, pancreas, or small and large bowel. This procedure is also called proximal gastric vagotomy.

All types of vagotomy can be performed at open surgery (laparotomy) or using minimally invasive surgery (laparoscopy).

For the management of PUD, vagotomy is sometimes combined with antrectomy (removal of the distal half of the stomach) to reduce the rate of recurrence. Reconstruction is performed with gastroduodenostomy (Billroth I) or gastrojejunostomy (Billroth II). It is left intact in highly selective vagotomy so the function of gastric emptying remains intact.

== Applications ==
=== Chronic duodenal ulcers ===
Truncal vagotomy is a treatment option for chronic duodenal ulcers. It was once considered the gold standard, but is now usually reserved for patients who have failed the first-line "triple therapy" against Helicobacter pylori infection: two antibiotics (clarithromycin and amoxicillin or metronidazole) and a proton pump inhibitor (e.g., omeprazole). It is also used in the treatment of gastric outlet obstruction.

=== Obesity ===
Following observations that obese patients with PUD lost substantial weight after truncal vagotomy, vagotomy was started in 1978 as a dedicated therapy for obesity. In 2007, the use of vagotomy to treat obesity was being studied. The vagus nerve provides efferent nervous signals out from the hunger and satiety centers of the hypothalamus, a region of the brain central to the regulation of food intake and energy expenditure. The circuit begins with an area of the hypothalamus, the arcuate nucleus, which has outputs to the lateral hypothalamus (LH) and ventromedial hypothalamus (VMH), the brain's feeding and satiety centers, respectively.

Animals with lesioned VMH will gain weight even in the face of severe restrictions imposed on their food intake, because they no longer provide the signaling needed to turn off energy storage and facilitate energy expenditure and fat burning.

In humans, the VMH is sometimes injured by ongoing treatment for acute lymphoblastic leukemia or surgery or radiation to treat posterior cranial fossa tumors. Disabling the VMH renders it unresponsive to peripheral energy balance signals; this, in turn, suppresses sympathetic activity (which leads to malaise and decreased energy expenditure) and stimulates vagal activity (which augments insulin production and adipogenesis (fat cell expansion)). Research shows that VMH dysfunction affects both energy intake and energy expenditure and is associated with constant weight gain, which results from a chronic positive energy balance caused by excessive energy intake and reduced metabolic rate. In the past, adrenergic or serotonergic agonists were investigated for the treatment of obesity by suppressing appetite and stimulating thermogenesis, but neither calorie restriction nor treatment with these thermogenic agents has been very successful in achieving and maintaining weight reduction. The vagus nerve is thought to be one key mediator of these effects, as lesions lead to chronic elevations in insulin secretion, inhibiting fat oxidation and promoting energy storage in adipocytes. Vagotomy may have an impact upon ghrelin. In an open-label, prospective study of 30 obese patients (26 women), response has been variable; the intervention has generally been safe, although adverse events have included gastric dumping syndrome (n=3), wound infection (n=2), other (n=5), and diarrhea (n=6).

== History ==
Vagotomy was once popular as a way of treating and preventing PUD and subsequent ulcer perforations. PUD was thought to be due to excess secretion of the acid environment in the stomach, or at least that PUD was made worse by hyperacidity. Vagotomy was a way to reduce the acidity of the stomach, by denervating the parietal cells that produce acid. This was done with the hope that it would treat or prevent peptic ulcers. It also had the effect of reducing or eliminating symptoms of gastroesophageal reflux in those who suffered from it. The incidence of vagotomy decreased following the discovery by Barry Marshall and Robin Warren that H. pylori is responsible for most peptic ulcers, because H. pylori can be treated much less invasively. One potential side effect of vagotomy is a vitamin B_{12} deficiency. As vagotomy decreases gastric secretion, intrinsic factor production can be impaired. Intrinsic factor is needed to absorb vitamin B_{12} efficiently from food, and injections or large oral doses of the vitamin may be required after such a procedure in certain populations. Large cohort studies from Asia demonstrated that vagotomy for PUD is associated with a decreased incidence in type 2 diabetes, ischemic stroke, liver cirrhosis and cancer, and ischemic heart disease.
