= Succussion splash =

Medical sign

A succussion splash, also known as a gastric splash, is a sloshing sound heard through a stethoscope during sudden movement of the patient on abdominal auscultation. It reflects the presence of gas and fluid in an obstructed organ, as in gastric outlet obstruction.

A physical examination can show an abdominal succussion splash, which is elicited by placing the stethoscope over the upper abdomen and rocking the patient back and forth at the hips. Retained gastric material greater than three hours after a meal will generate a splash sound and indicate the presence of a hollow viscus filled with both fluid and gas. An example would be a gastric outlet obstruction (GOO) due to pyloric stenosis, with abdominal succussion splash.
