= Hans Finsterer =

Hans Finsterer (June 24, 1877 in Weng im Innkreis – November 4, 1955 in Vienna) was an Austrian surgeon.

He is known for the Hofmeister-Finsterer operation
