= Ludwig Heusner =

German surgeon

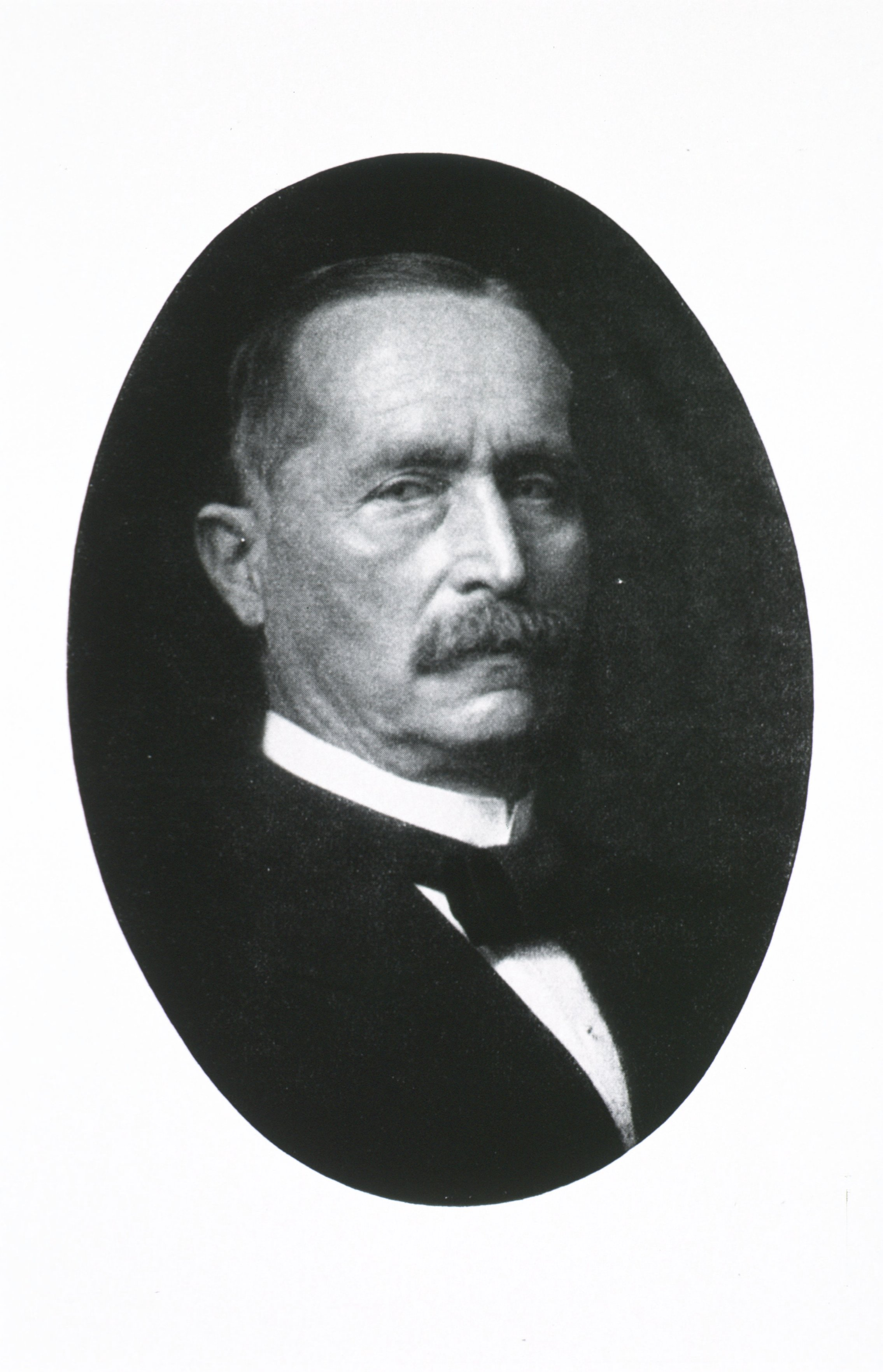
Ludwig Heusner

Ludwig Heusner (28 November 1843 in Boppard – 27 January 1916 in Giessen) was a German surgeon.

Heusner studied medicine at the universities of Berlin, Heidelberg, Würzburg, Bonn and Kiel, receiving his doctorate in 1868. He served as an assistant physician during the Franco-Prussian War, and following the end of hostilities, settled as a general practitioner in Barmen (presently part of the city of Wuppertal). In 1878 he was named senior physician at the hospital in Barmen, and in 1903 was awarded with the title of professor.

In 1898 Heusner co-founded the Vereinigung Niederrheinisch-Westfälischer Chirurgen (Union of Lower Rhenish-Westphalian surgeons). In 1904 he was appointed president of the Deutschen Gesellschaft für Orthopädie (German Society for Orthopedics).

On 19 May 1892 Heusner was the first surgeon to perform a successful repair of a gastric ulcer.

== Selected writings ==
- Ueber Oberkieferresection mit mö̈glichster Schonung der Weichtheile, (1889).
- Ein Fall von einem frei in der Bauchhöhle perforirten Magengeschwür; Laparotomie; Naht der Perforationsstelle; Heilung, reported by Hermann Kriege, (1892) – A case of a perforation in the abdomen (stomach ulcer); laparotomy; suture of the perforation.
- Demonstration neuer Apparate zur Behandlung des Klumpfußes. Z. Orthop. XI, (1904).
- Beitrag zur Behandlung der tuberkulösen Hüftgelenkverrenkung. Z. Orthop. XXV, (1910).
