= Endoscopic stenting =

- Specialty: Gastroenterology

Endoscopic stenting is a medical procedure by which a stent, a hollow device designed to prevent constriction or collapse of a tubular organ, is inserted by endoscopy. They are usually inserted when a disease process has led to narrowing or obstruction of an organ, such as the esophagus or the colon.

There are various types of endoscopic stents: plastic stents, uncovered self-expandable metallic stents, partially covered self-expandable metallic stents, and fully covered self-expandable metallic stents. Self-expandable metallic stents "play an important role in the management of malignant obstructing lesions in the gastrointestinal tract."

A stent may be inserted into the common bile duct during an endoscopic retrograde cholangiopancreatography, especially if gallstone removal is deemed too risky.

== Complications ==
One complication of metallic stents is stent migration (occurring in 20 to 40% of cases). Stents with anchoring flaps or flared ends can reduce the risk of migration. Cholecystitis can be a complication for stenting of malignant biliary stricture. Stent occlusion may occur from tumor or tissue overgrowth, or due to sludge deposits, causing the development of cholangitis.
