= Stay sutures =

Surgical technique

Stay sutures are temporary surgical sutures which are placed during operation to hold or manipulate the operating area. In cases of ocular surgery, tracheostomy, suprapubic cystolithotomy, appendicectomy, ureterolithotomy, or choledocholithotomy stay sutures can be given. They can be used to temporarily align a structure to stabilize it. This can allow a surgeon to work more safely around the area, without the possibility of a clamp slipping and falling out of place. Stay sutures can also limit bleeding in an area where key vessels may be disturbed. Usually they are removed at the end of the surgery prior to the closure of the incision, although they may be left in place if the surgeon feels they pose no risk to the patient. They can also be placed at the end of strabismus surgery to avoid that the eye drifts back to its original position. Stay sutures can sometimes be used in the management of surgical emergencies. Stay sutures are kept in place with the help of hemostatic artery forceps.

== See also ==
- Cervical cerclage
