= Christian Friedrich Michaelis =

German physician (1754–1814)

Christian Friedrich Michaelis (13 May 1754 – 17 February 1814) was a German physician. Son of biblical scholar and teacher Johann David Michaelis and half-brother of writer Caroline Schelling.

== Biography ==
Born in Göttingen, Holy Roman Empire, Michaelis studied medicine in Göttingen and Groningen. Later, he graduated in Strasbourg in 1776. He began practicing in Paris and then London before coming to America in 1777 as a field doctor with the Hessian forces. For much of the war, he operated a private practice in New York City, wherein he embarked on experiments that would lead him to foundational observations about nerve-regeneration. His work from this period made him an early pioneer in neurological surgery.

Michaelis asserted that injuries wherein nerves were damaged or separated could heal and regain lost sensation and mobility. As evidence, he cited his experiments alongside his experience as a field surgeon treating gunshot wounds and the like. During this time, he also became close acquaintances with Dr. Benjamin Rush and even dedicated a later volume of his 1778 De Angina Polyposa sive Membranacea to the American founding-father. He was elected as a member to the American Philosophical Society in 1785.

Returning to Germany in 1783, Michaelis became chair of the practice of medicine at Cassel before earning an appointment as professor of anatomy at the University of Marburg in 1786. He continued to study and publish findings on nerve regeneration alongside varied topics like tonsillitis and bladder stones. He served as professor of anatomy in Marburg until his death decades later.

== Family ==
Christian Friedrich Michaelis was married Friederike Sophie Charlotte von Breidenbach zu Breidenstein (1752–1814), daughter of landowner, privy councillor, and chief landowner Carl Friedrich Christian von Breidenbach zu Breidenstein (1717–1799), and widow of colonel Kurt Hilmar Carl von der Malsburg (1727–1784). The marriage remained childless.
