= Synovial osteochondromatosis =

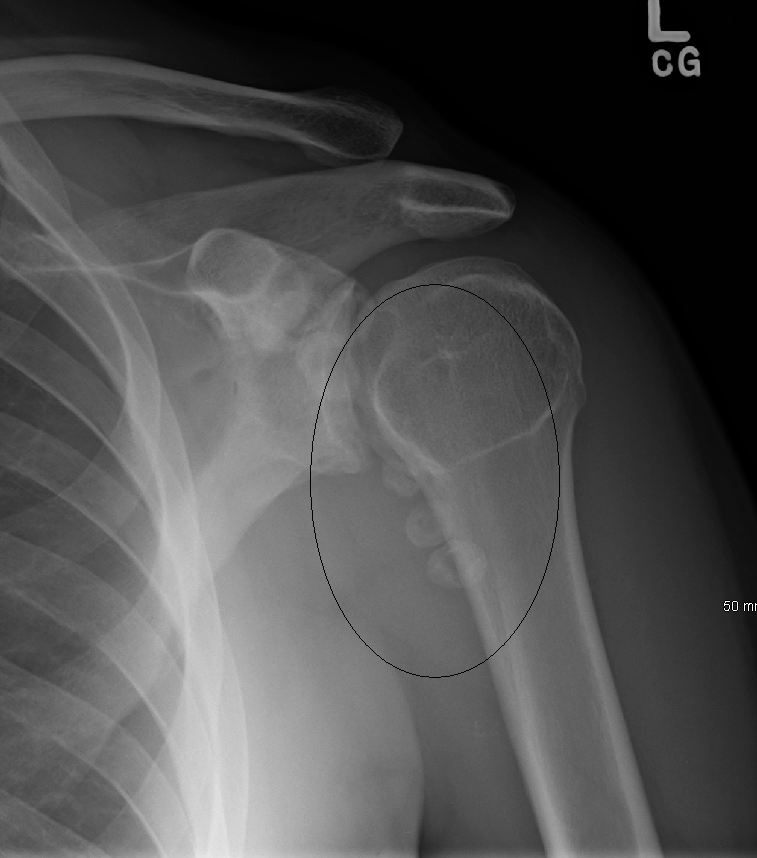
- Synovial osteochondromatosis
- Specialty: Rheumatology

Synovial osteochondromatosis (SOC) (synonyms include synovial chondromatosis, primary synovial chondromatosis, synovial chondrometaplasia) is a rare disease that creates a benign change or proliferation in the synovium or joint-lining tissue, which changes to form bone-forming cartilage. In most occurrences, there is only one joint affected, either the knee, the hip, or the elbow. Rarely involves the TMJ.

The cause is unknown.

In this condition, cartilaginous metaplasia takes place within the synovial membrane of the joint. Metaplastic synovium organizes into nodules. With minor trauma, nodules are shed as small bodies into the joint space. In some patients, the disease process may involve tendon sheaths and bursal sacs.

Cartilaginous intra-articular bodies float freely within the synovial fluid, which they require for nutrition and growth. Progressive enlargement and ossification occur with time. If they remain free, they continue to grow larger and more calcified. In severe cases, they may occupy the entire joint space or penetrate to adjacent tissues. Also, they can deposit in the synovial lining, reestablish a blood supply, and become replaced by bone. On occasion, synovial reattachment can lead to complete reabsorption of the cartilage fragment.

== Signs and symptoms ==
Chronic, progressive pain and swelling of the affected joint are exacerbated by physical activity. Joint effusion and limited range of motion are common associated features. It affects primarily large joints, including knee (>50% of cases), elbow, hip, and shoulder. SOC is twice as common in men as women. Some patients have intra-articular bodies resting in stable positions within joint recesses or bursae. These patients may be asymptomatic, with SOC merely as an incidental finding at imaging.

=== Complications ===
Malignant transformation to synovial chondrosarcoma. This is a very rare complication occurring in chronic cases. Treatment entails synovial excision and total joint replacement.

Clicking, grating, or locking may result from acute mechanical problems due to intra-articular bodies within the affected joint. Locking may destroy articular cartilage, resulting in secondary osteoarthritis. Symptoms such as joint stiffness and aching are the result of osteoarthritis that sets in after years of persistent joint irritation.

== Diagnosis ==
=== Radiography ===
Typical finding is of multiple, smooth, oval-shaped calcified masses within the joint space or bursa. They have a characteristic popcorn-ball appearance of calcified cartilage. With serial imaging, masses may be found to change in size, disappear, or migrate to recessed areas of the joint. They may pass from the main joint cavity into a neighboring synovial cyst. For this reason, a mass may not be appreciated within the actual joint space itself.

Additional radiographic findings include joint effusion and degenerative changes such as joint space narrowing, subchondral sclerosis, and osteophyte formation.

=== Computed tomography ===
CT is best utilized in earlier stages of the disease process before cartilaginous bodies have calcified (become filled with calcium). CT can effectively detect non-calcified masses or those with only minimal calcification, which allows the radiologist to distinguish this condition from a simple joint effusion.

=== Magnetic resonance imaging ===
MR appearance depends on the composition of the intra-articular body. Entirely cartilaginous bodies will appear isointense to muscle on T1 and hyperintense to muscle on T2 weighted images. Partly calcified intra-articular bodies demonstrate foci of absent signal on all pulse sequences. Like CT arthrography, MR with gadolinium may be used to detect intra-articular bodies that have not yet calcified.

=== Pathology ===
Cartilaginous bodies or osteocartilaginous bodies with central ossification may be noted. They are typically spherical in shape. Sizes range from several millimeters to several centimeters in diameter. The synovium of the involved joint demonstrates villous hyperplasia, which imparts a wrinkled appearance on gross examination. There may be cartilaginous bodies attached to the synovium. Synovial involvement may be focal or diffuse in nature.

=== Differential diagnosis ===
- Trauma-related:
  - Fracture with avulsed fragment
  - Fragmentation of meniscus with calcification
- Degenerative joint disease related:
  - Degenerative joint disease with detached spur
- Synovial proliferation:
  - Pigmented villonodular synovitis
- Neoplastic:
  - Synovial chondrosarcoma
- Other:
  - Osteochondritis dissecans
  - Sequestrum from osteomyelitis
  - Neuropathic (Charcot) joint

Intra-articular bodies in SOC typically have popcorn calcification, with a dense sclerotic border with radiolucent central region. This distinct radiographic appearance sets it apart from other causes of intra-articular bodies. Number and size of intra-articular bodies can prove helpful as well. SOC typically presents as multiple intra-articular bodies. Few or isolated intra-articular bodies are more consistent with trauma or osteoarthritis.

=== Classification ===
Classification is divided into primary versus secondary SOC. Primary SOC occurs in an otherwise normal joint. It is suggested by monoarticular involvement in a patient in the third to fifth decades of life. Secondary SOC occurs in older patients in joints previously affected by joint disease such as osteoarthritis. This pattern is suggested by bilateral involvement with multiple joint intra-articular bodies.

== Treatment ==
Asymptomatic patients do not require therapy. Symptomatic patients should undergo arthroscopic or surgical removal of intra-articular bodies. Patients who have recurrent intra-articular bodies or in whom the entire synovial lining is metaplastic require total synovectomy.
