= Fritz Lange (surgeon) =

German orthopedic surgeon

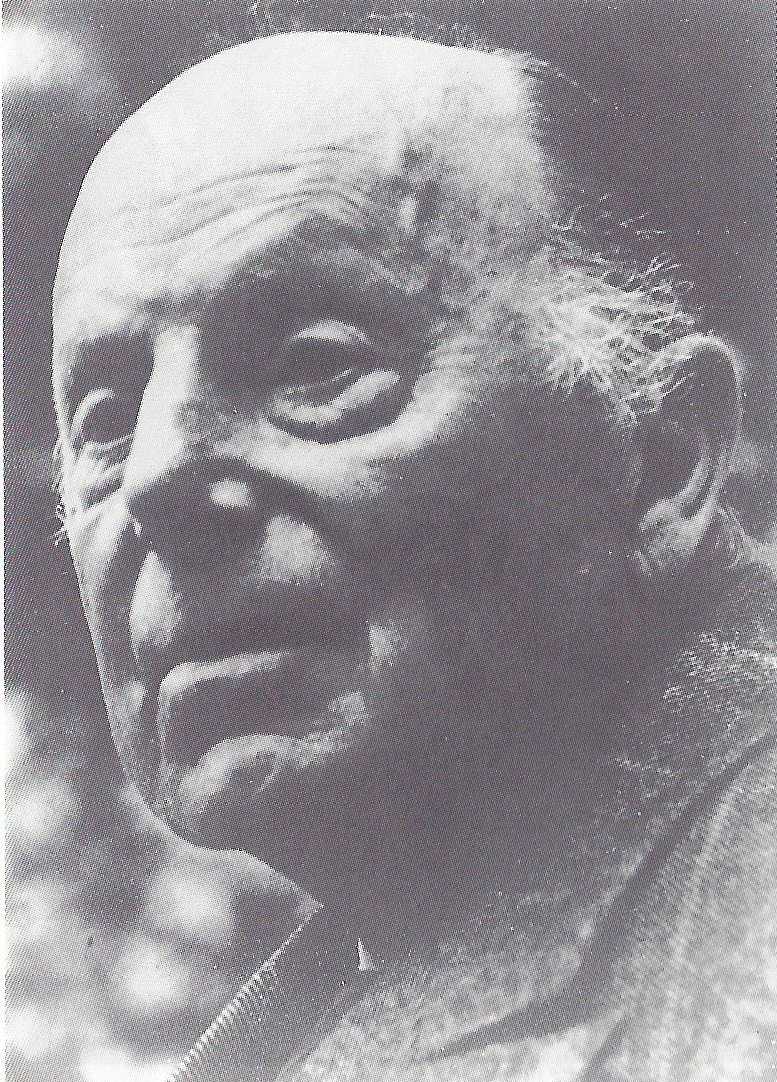
Fritz Lange

Fritz Lange (21 June 1864 in Dessau – 19 November 1952 in Wackersberg) was a German orthopedic surgeon.

He studied medicine at the University of Jena, Leipzig University, and the Ludwig-Maximilians-Universität München, receiving his doctorate in 1892. He furthered his education at the University of Rostock and the University of Strasbourg, where he was pupil of Otto Wilhelm Madelung. In 1895, he studied orthopedics under Adolf Lorenz at the University of Vienna, and during the following year, obtained his habilitation for orthopedic surgery. In 1908, he became a full professor of orthopedics at the Ludwig-Maximilians-Universität München.

In 1909, he was named president of the Deutsche Gesellschaft für Orthopädische Chirurgie (German Society for Orthopedic Surgery). He was an editor of the periodical "Münchener Medizinischen Wochenschrift" (Munich Medical Weekly).

He made contributions in his research of congenital hip dislocation, torticollis, scoliosis and spinal tuberculosis. He is remembered for his pioneer work with tendon transplants and artificial ligaments (made of silk).

== Selected works ==
- Chirurgie und orthopädie im kindesalter, with Hans Spitzy, 1910 – Surgery and orthopedics in childhood.
- Lehrbuch der Orthopädie, 1914 – Textbook of orthopedics.
- Die behandlung der knochenbrüche durch den praktischen arzt, 1926 – On treatment of bones.
- Die epidemische kinderlähmung, 1930 – The polio epidemic.
- Die sprache des menschlichen antlitzes; eine wissenschaftliche physiognomik und ihre praktische verwertung im leben und in der kunst, 1937 – Language of the human face; scientific physiognomy and its practical utilization in life and art.
