= Georg Joachimsthal =

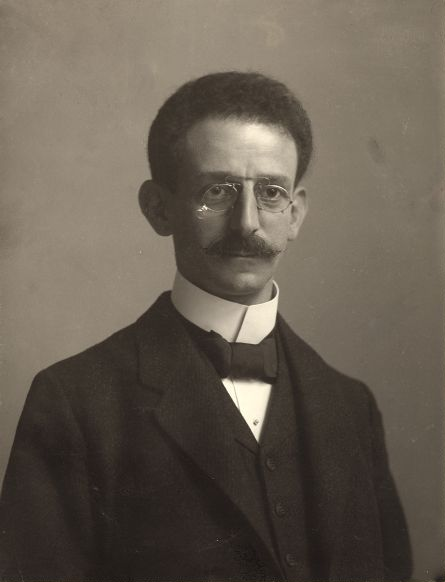
Georg Joachimsthal (1863-1914)

Georg Joachimsthal (8 May 1863 – 28 February 1914) was a German orthopedist who was native of Stargard in Pommern.

In 1887 he earned his medical doctorate from Friedrich Wilhelm University with a dissertation on scoliosis titled Zur Pathologie und Therapie der Skoliose, and afterwards remained in Berlin as an assistant to Julius Wolff (1836-1902). He received his habilitation in 1898, and two years later founded a private clinic. In 1908 he became an associate professor and director of the orthopedic university polyclinic in Berlin.

In Berlin, Joachimsthal performed important experimental studies involving the physiological effects of orthopedic procedures. He was a founding member of the Deutschen Orthopädischen Gesellschaft (German Orthopedic Society), and in 1910 founded the Berlin Orthopedic Society.

In 1905 he published a highly regarded textbook on orthopedic surgery called Handbuch der Orthopädischen Chirurgie. In 1907 became an editor of the Zeitschrift für Orthopädische Chirurgie.
