= Karl Wilhelm Ernst Joachim Schönborn =

German surgeon

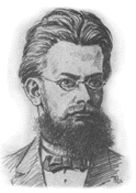
Karl Wilhelm Schönborn (1840-1906)

Karl Wilhelm Ernst Joachim Schönborn (May 8, 1840 – 1906) was a German surgeon who was a native of Breslau.

He studied medicine at the Universities of Breslau, Heidelberg, Göttingen and Berlin, receiving his medical doctorate in 1863. At Berlin, he worked as an assistant to Robert Ferdinand Wilms (1824-1880) at Bethanien Hospital and to Bernhard von Langenbeck (1810-1887) at the university hospital. In 1871 he became a professor at the university surgical clinic at Königsberg. From 1886 until his death in 1906, he was a professor of surgery at the University of Würzburg.

Schönborn is remembered for his surgical work involving velopharyngeal insufficiency (VPI), commonly referred to as cleft palate. In 1875, he described the first true pharyngeal flap surgery, an inferiorly based flap surgery for VPI. He would perform several of these operations in the following years, and in 1886 switched to a superiorly based flap operation. He described these procedures in Ueber eine neue Methode der Staphylorrhaphie (1875), and Vorstellung eines falle von Staphyloplastik (1886).
