= Billroth I =

Surgical procedure

- Other names: Billroth's operation I Gastroduodenostomy
- ICD-9-CM: 43.6

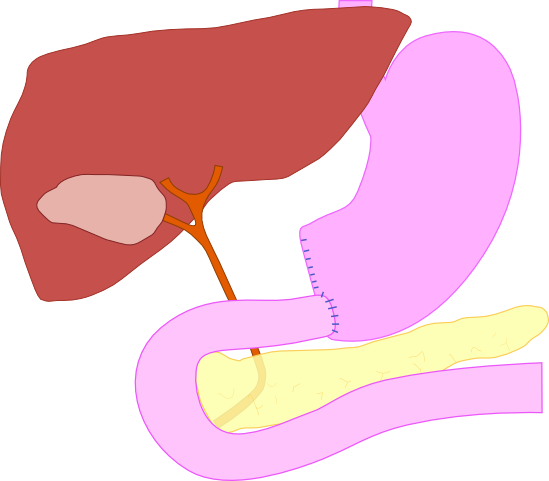
Simple diagram of distal gastrectomy with Billroth I.

Billroth I, more formally Billroth's operation I, is an operation in which the pylorus is removed and the distal stomach is anastomosed directly to the duodenum.

The operation is most closely associated with Theodor Billroth, but was first described by Polish surgeon Ludwik Rydygier.

The surgical procedure is called a gastroduodenostomy.

== See also ==
- Anatomical terms of location
- Billroth II
- Roux-en-Y anastomosis
