= Billroth II =

Operation removing part of the stomach

- Anatomy after a partial gastrectomy
- Other names: Billroth's operation II; Partial gastrectomy and gastrojejunostomy
- ICD-9-CM: 43.7

Billroth II, more formally Billroth's operation II, is an operation in which a partial gastrectomy (removal of the stomach) is performed, and the cut end of the stomach is closed. The greater curvature of the stomach (not involved with the previous closure of the stomach) is then connected to the first part of the jejunum (gastrojejunostomy) using an end-to-side anastomosis. The Billroth II always follows resection of the lower part of the stomach (antrum). The Billroth II is often indicated in refractory peptic ulcer disease and gastric adenocarcinoma.

Over the years, the Billroth II operation has been colloquially referred to as any partial removal of the stomach with an end to side connection to the stomach as shown in the picture; however, technically, this picture is a modification of Billroth's operation called a partial gastrectomy with a Krönlein anastomosis where the divided end of the stomach is directly anastomosed to the side of the jejunal loop. Robotic techniques are now available to perform the procedure.

== Postoperative complications ==
A stump blow-out is one of the more significant postoperative complications, in which a leak occurs from the blind end of the duodenum.

== History ==
von Hacker was the first person to refer to the Billroth II partial gastrectomy operation writing from Billroth's clinic in 1885.

== See also ==
- Billroth I
- Roux-en-Y
