= Micronucleus test =

Test for potential genotoxic compounds

A micronucleus test is a test used in toxicological screening for potential genotoxic compounds. The assay is now recognized as one of the most successful and reliable assays for genotoxic carcinogens, i.e., carcinogens that act by causing genetic damage and is recommended by the OECD guideline for the testing of chemicals. There are two major versions of this test, one in vivo and the other in vitro.

The in vivo test normally uses mouse bone marrow or mouse peripheral blood. When a bone marrow erythroblast develops into a polychromatic erythrocyte, the main nucleus is extruded; any micronucleus that has been formed may remain behind in the otherwise anucleated cytoplasm. Visualisation of micronuclei is facilitated in these cells because they lack a main nucleus. An increase in the frequency of micronucleated polychromatic erythrocytes in treated animals is an indication of induced chromosome damage.

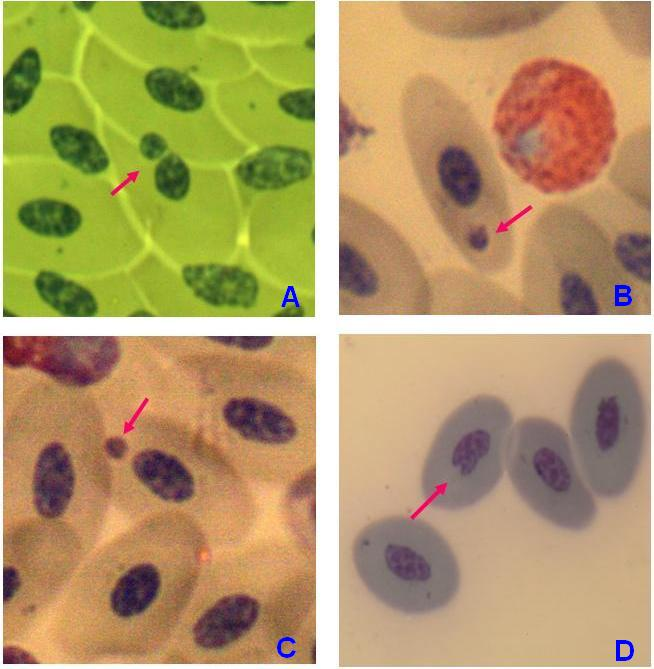
Micronuclei (B, C) and nuclear abnormalities (A, D) in peripheral blood erythrocytes of penguins Pygoscelis papua.

Micronuclei were first used to quantify chromosomal damage by H.J. Evans et al., in root tips of the Broad Bean, Vicia faba. Subsequently, the in vivo assay was developed independently by W. Schmid and by J.A. Heddle and their colleagues. The mouse peripheral blood assay was developed by J.T. MacGregor and has now been adapted for measurement by flow cytometry by A. Tometsko and colleagues. The first use of micronuclei in cultured cells was by J.A. Heddle and colleagues in human lymphocytes. The assay has been improved by M. Fenech and colleagues for use in lymphocytes and other cells in culture cells.

Simple Giemsa staining was originally used for MN scoring. Later, the cytokinesis-block micronucleus (CBMN) method was established, where Cyt-B, an inhibitor of the spindle assembly, was used to prevent cytokinesis occurring after nuclear division. The CBMN method is used for the assessment of chromosomal loss, breakage, and associated apoptosis and necrosis induced by different mutagens.

A micronucleus is the erratic (third) nucleus that is formed during the anaphase of mitosis or meiosis. Micronuclei (the name means 'small nucleus') are cytoplasmic bodies having a portion of acentric chromosome or whole chromosome which was not carried to the opposite poles during the anaphase. Their formation results in the daughter cell lacking a part or all of a chromosome. These chromosome fragments or whole chromosomes normally develop nuclear membranes and form as micronuclei as a third nucleus. After cytokinesis, one daughter cell ends up with one nucleus and the other ends up with one large and one small nucleus, i.e., micronuclei. There is a chance of more than one micronucleus forming when more genetic damage has happened. The micronucleus test is used as a tool for genotoxicity assessment of various chemicals. It is easier to conduct than the chromosomal aberration test in terms of procedures and evaluation. Using fluorescent in situ hybridization (FISH) with probes targeted to the centromere region, it can be determined if a whole chromosome, or only a fragment is lost.

== See also ==
- Cancerous Micronuclei
- Micronucleus
