= Safety of magnetic resonance imaging =

MRI safety and risk factors

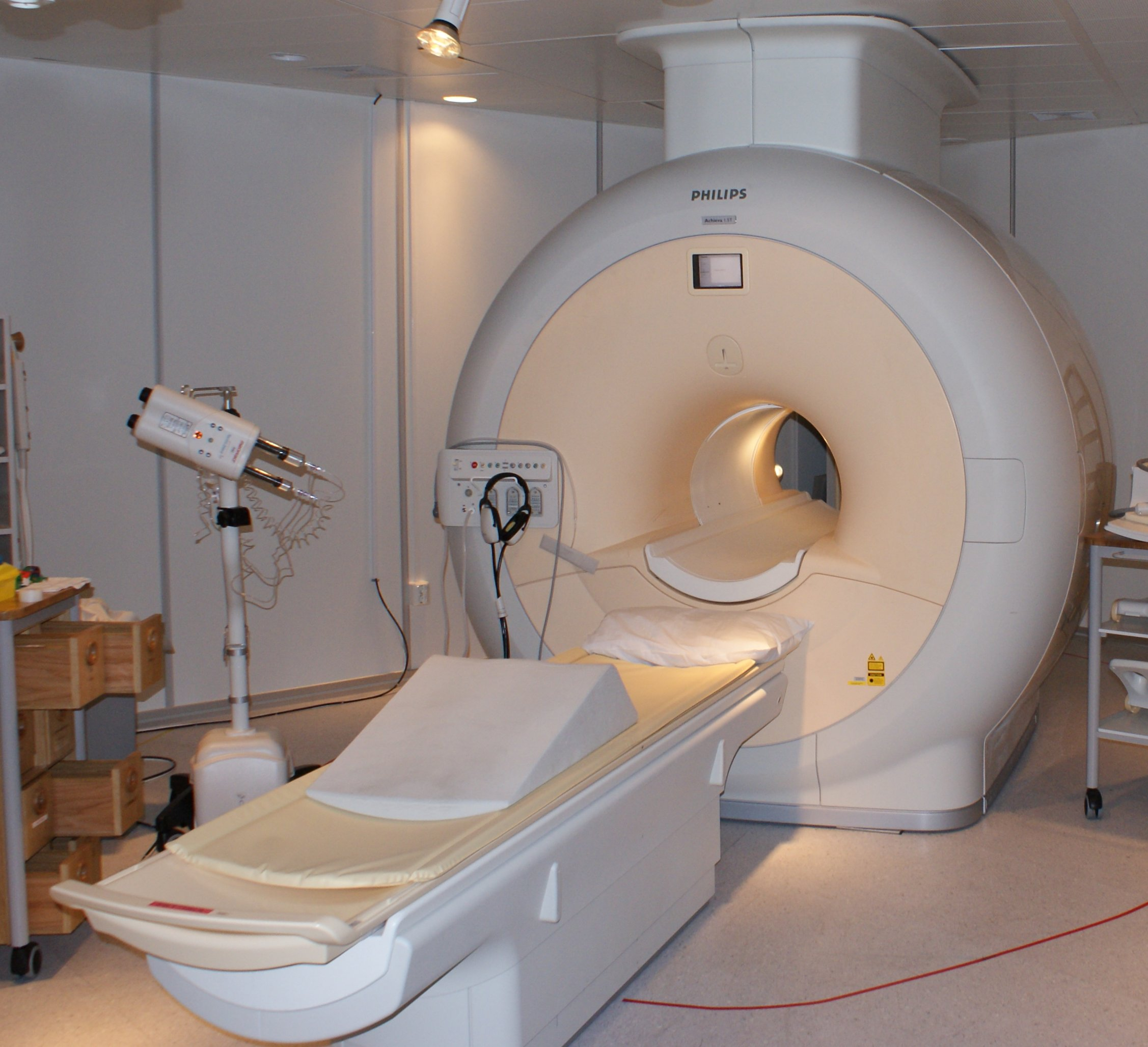
Medical MRI scanner

Magnetic resonance imaging (MRI) is in general a safe technique, although injuries may occur as a result of failed safety procedures or human error. Though not specifically on MRI exposures or risks, during the last 150 years thousands of papers focusing on the effects or side effects of magnetic or radiofrequency fields, both of which are used in magnetic resonance imaging, have been published. Contraindications or risk-complications to MRI exams may include many active implants, such as cochlear implants and cardiac pacemakers, along with passive objects, including stents, orthopedic implants, as well as shrapnel and metallic foreign bodies. Increasingly, some contraindications are not seen as the absolute prohibitions to MRI scans that they once were, and a skilled provider may be able to find safe ways to make MRI exams accessible to some patients who had previously been prohibited from MRI studies because of an implant, for example, a pacemaker. Since MRI does not use any ionizing radiation, its use generally is favored in preference to CT when either modality could yield similarly valuable information. (In certain cases, MRI is not preferred as it may be more expensive, time-consuming and claustrophobia-exacerbating.)

== MRI Safety Regulation ==
International standards regarding the design, manufacture, and marketing of medical devices, including the MRI scanners, themselves, exist and are rather robust. Contemporary reports of MRI accidents and injuries are dominated by point-of-care related events, and not by failure / error / malfunction of MRI scanners.

Despite identified, anticipatable, and preventable risks related to point-of-care MRI service, as of 2026 MRI was largely unregulated with respect to minimum MRI safety training of MRI system operators, radiologists, or radiology managers. Similarly, in the United States there are virtually no operational requirements for the protection of patients or healthcare workers in the context of enterprise licenses for hospitals or outpatient imaging centers.

Of the few international accreditation organizations that have MRI requirements, they fall well short of the professionally approved model standards or standard of care documents. In short, the decisions of which protections to implement are largely left to the individual MRI providing facility, and are not prescribed by minimum licensure or accreditation standards.

== MRI Safety Personnel Structure and Certification ==
In an effort to standardize the roles and responsibilities of MRI professionals, an international consensus document, written and endorsed by major MRI and medical physics professional societies from around the globe, has been published formally. The document outlines specific responsibilities for the following positions:

- MR Medical Director / Research Director (MRMD) – This individual is the supervising physician who has oversight responsibility for the safe use of MRI services.
- MR Safety Officer (MRSO) – Roughly analogous to a radiation safety officer, the MRSO acts on behalf of, and on the instruction of, the MRMD to execute safety procedures and practices at the point of care.
- MR Safety Expert (MRSE) – This individual serves in a consulting role to both the MRMD and MRSO, assisting in the investigation of safety questions that may include the need for extrapolation, interpolation, or quantification to approximate the risk of a specific study.

The International Board of Magnetic Resonance Safety (IBMRS) has provided testing and board certification for each of the original three positions, MRMD, MRSO, and MRSE, since 2015. In 2026 the IBMRS introduced a fourth certification for MR Safety Tech (MRST), which intends to credential MRI technologist aides in the safety knowledge of a non-technologist needed to manage the environment and patient care. As most MRI accidents and injuries are directly attributable to decisions at the point of care, testing and certification of MRI professionals seeks to reduce the rates of MRI accidents and improve patient safety through the establishment of safety competency levels for MRI professionals.

== Implants ==
MR Safe symbol

MR Conditional symbol

MR Unsafe symbol

All patients are reviewed for contraindications prior to MRI scanning. Many medical devices and implants are categorized as MR Safe, MR Conditional or MR Unsafe (although many medical products or devices remain untested):

- MR Safe – The device or implant is completely non-magnetic, non-electrically conductive, and non-RF reactive, eliminating all of the primary potential threats during an MRI procedure.
- MR Conditional – A device or implant that may contain magnetic, electrically conductive, or RF-reactive components that is safe for operations in proximity to the MRI, provided the conditions for safe operation are defined and observed (such as 'tested safe to 1.5 teslas' or 'safe in magnetic fields below 500 gauss in strength').
- MR Unsafe – Objects that are significantly ferromagnetic and pose a clear and direct threat to persons and equipment within the magnet room.

The MRI environment may cause harm in patients with MR Unsafe devices, including some cochlear implants, aneurysm clips, and permanent pacemakers.

Throughout the clinical history of MRI, numerous injuries and fatalities have occurred.

Several deaths have been reported in patients with pacemakers who have undergone MRI scanning without appropriate precautions. Increasingly, MR Conditional pacemakers are available for selected patients, significantly reducing risks of MRI exams for these patients.

Ferromagnetic foreign bodies such as shell fragments, or metallic implants such as surgical prostheses and ferromagnetic aneurysm clips also may also be potential risks. Interaction of the static magnetic field and dynamic magnetic fields (including radio frequency fields) with such objects may produce pulling, twisting, or heating of objects not specifically designed for safety during an MRI. MRI may be contraindicated in those suspected with metallic foreign body in the eye.

Many contemporary implants and medical devices are constructed of materials that minimize the risks in MRI. Titanium and its alloys are one group of metals which are safe from attraction and torque forces produced by the magnetic field.

Intrauterine devices with copper are generally safe in MRI, but may become dislodged or even expelled, and it is therefore recommended to check the location of the IUD both before and after MRI.

Other implants that are contraindicated in MRI may include: magnetic dental implants, tissue expanders, artificial limbs, hearing aids, catheters with metallic components such as the Swan-Ganz catheter and piercings. However, tooth amalgam is not contraindicated in MRI.

== MRI Risk Categories ==
=== Static Magnetic Field Risks of Attraction / Rotation ===
The very high strength of the magnetic field may cause projectile effect (or "missile-effect") accidents, where ferromagnetic objects are attracted towards the magnet. Pennsylvania reported 27 cases of objects becoming projectiles in the MRI environment between 2004 and 2008, though it is widely held that MRI error reporting is under-representative of the actual numbers of incident. There have been incidents of injury and death. In one case, a six-year-old boy died in July 2001, during an MRI exam at the Westchester Medical Center, New York, after a metal oxygen tank was pulled across the room and crushed the child's head. In a 2025 incident, a man was pulled by a weight-training chain around his neck into an MRI scanner.

To reduce the risk of projectile accidents, magnetic or magnetizable objects and devices are typically prohibited near the MRI scanner and the rooms prior, and patients undergoing MRI examinations must remove all metallic objects, often by changing into a gown or scrubs. Some radiology departments use ferromagnetic detection devices to ensure that no ferromagnetic objects enter the scanner room.

=== Radio Frequency (RF) Risks of Heating ===
Every MRI scanner has a powerful radio transmitter that generates the electromagnetic field that excites the spins. If the body absorbs the energy, heating occurs. For this reason, the transmitter rate at which energy is absorbed by the body must be limited (see Specific absorption rate). It has been claimed that tattoos made with iron-containing dyes may lead to burns on the subject's body. Cosmetics are very unlikely to undergo heating, as well as body lotions, since the outcome of the reactions between those with the radio waves is unknown. The best option for clothing is 100% cotton.

==== Risk of implant heating under MRI ====
Electrical currents arising from the radiofrequency field and the switched gradient field may (due to Faraday's law of magnetic induction) produce focal heating (burns). Electrically conductive materials (eg, metals) have at least the potential to heat when exposed to the MRI's electromagnetic fields that are used during imaging.

Implants with metallic or electrically conductive parts may interact with the switched gradient and/or RF fields used in MRI, causing trauma or burns.

Following Faraday's law, the change of the magnetic flux through such a device induces eddy currents in the device and the metal subsequently converts electric energy into thermal energy... Furthermore, under specific conditions… gradient switching induced heating of other conductive material such as titanium, nitinol, or 316 stainless steel must be expected.

— Hansjörg Graf, Günter Steidle, Fritz Schick, Heating of metallic implants and instruments induced by gradient switching in a 1.5‐tesla whole‐body unit

The amount of heating that takes place has a number of contributing factors:

A primary safety concern related to MRI is metallic medical implant heating by absorbing radiofrequency (RF) energy. This risk depends on the metal type, shape and orientation, the RF frequency and the pulse sequence type and parameters.

— M Hasegawa, K Miyata, Y Abe, and T Ishigami, Radiofrequency heating of metallic dental devices during 3.0 T MRI

Injuries have been reported by this heating of metallic implants:

Event Description: It was reported to Siemens that a patient suffered a second degree burn on her right forearm after examination on the magnetom trio system... The patient has a titanium rod and screws placed in the right humerus. Patient has no feeling in right arm. Approximately five hours after the examination, the patient reported redness and a second degree blister, approximately 8 cm in length and 1,5 cm in width on the upper right forearm... According to the investigation from our experts, the RF burn was likely caused due to the presence of a titanium rod and screws placed in the right humerus.

— FDA, MAUDE Adverse Event Report

=== Time-Varying Gradient Risks of Induced Voltages ===
The rapid switching on and off of the magnetic field gradients is capable of causing nerve stimulation. Volunteers report a twitching sensation when exposed to rapidly switched fields, particularly in their extremities. The reason the peripheral nerves are stimulated is that the changing field increases with distance from the center of the gradient coils (which more or less coincides with the center of the magnet). Although PNS was not a problem for the slow, weak gradients used in the early days of MRI, the strong, rapidly switched gradients used in techniques such as EPI, fMRI, diffusion MRI, etc. are capable of inducing PNS. American and European regulatory agencies insist that manufacturers stay below specified dB/dt limits (dB/dt is the change in magnetic field strength per unit time), or else prove that no PNS is induced for any imaging sequence. As a result of dB/dt limitation, commercial MRI systems cannot use the full rated power of their gradient amplifiers.

==== Acoustic noise ====
Switching of field gradients causes a change in the Lorentz force experienced by the gradient coils, producing minute expansions and contractions of the coil. As the switching typically is in the audible frequency range, the resulting vibration produces loud noises (clicking, banging or beeping). This behaviour, of sound being generated by the vibration of the conducting components, is described as a coupled acousto-magneto-mechanical system, solutions to which provide useful insight to the behaviour of the scanners. This is most marked with high-field machines, and rapid-imaging techniques in which sound pressure levels may reach 120 dB(A) (equivalent to a jet engine at take-off), and therefore, appropriate ear protection is essential for anyone inside the MRI scanner room during the examination.

Radio frequency in itself does not cause audible noises (at least for human beings), since modern systems are using frequencies of 8.5 MHz (0.2 T system) or higher.

== MRI-EEG ==
In research settings, structural MRI or functional MRI (fMRI) may be combined with EEG (electroencephalography) under the condition that the EEG equipment is MR-compatible. Although EEG equipment (electrodes, amplifiers, and peripherals) are either approved for research or clinical use, the same MR Safe, MR Conditional and MR Unsafe terminology applies. With the growth of the use of MR technology, the U.S. Food & Drug Administration [FDA] recognized the need for a consensus on standards of practice, and the FDA sought out ASTM International [ASTM] to achieve them. Committee F04 of ASTM developed F2503, Standard Practice for Marking Medical Devices and Other Items for Safety in the Magnetic Resonance Environment.

== Genotoxic effects ==
There is no proven risk of biological harm from any aspect of an MRI scan, including very powerful static magnetic fields, gradient magnetic fields, or radio frequency waves. Some studies have suggested possible genotoxic (i.e., potentially carcinogenic) effects of MRI scanning through micronuclei induction and DNA double strand breaks in vivo and in vitro, however, in most, if not all cases, others have been unable to repeat or validate the results of these studies, and the majority of research shows no genotoxic, or otherwise harmful, effects caused by any part of MRI. A recent study confirmed that MRI using some of the most potentially-risky parameters tested to date (7-tesla static magnetic field, 70 mT/m gradient magnetic field, and maximum strength radio frequency waves) did not cause any DNA damage in vitro.

== Cryogens ==
As described in the Physics of magnetic resonance imaging article, many MRI scanners rely on cryogenic liquids to enable the superconducting capabilities of the electromagnetic coils within. Although the cryogenic liquids used are non-toxic, their physical properties present specific hazards.

An unintentional shut-down of a superconducting electromagnet, an event known as "quench", involves the rapid boiling of liquid helium from the device. If the rapidly expanding helium cannot be dissipated through an external vent, sometimes referred to as a 'quench pipe', it may be released into the scanner room where it may cause displacement of the oxygen and present a risk of asphyxiation.

Liquid helium, the most commonly used cryogen in MRI, undergoes near explosive expansion as it changes from a liquid to gaseous state. The use of an oxygen monitor is important to ensure that oxygen levels are safe for patients and physicians. Rooms built for superconducting MRI equipment that require quench pipes for the exhaust of escaping helium gas should be equipped with pressure relief mechanisms and an exhaust fan, in addition to the required quench pipe.

Because a quench results in rapid loss of cryogens from the magnet, recommissioning the magnet is expensive and time-consuming. Spontaneous quenches are uncommon, but a quench also may be triggered by an equipment malfunction, an improper cryogen fill technique, contaminants inside the cryostat, or extreme magnetic or vibrational disturbances.

== Pregnancy ==
Adverse effects of non-contrast MRI on the fetus are not strongly supported by contemporary evidence. As opposed to many other forms of medical imaging in pregnancy, MRI avoids the use of ionizing radiation, to which the fetus is particularly sensitive. As a precaution, however, many guidelines recommend pregnant women only undergo MRI when essential, especially during the first trimester.

The concerns in pregnancy are the same as for MRI in general, but the fetus may be more sensitive to the effects—particularly to heating and to noise. The use of gadolinium-based contrast media in pregnancy is an off-label indication and may be administered only in the lowest dose required to provide essential diagnostic information.

Despite these concerns, MRI is rapidly growing in importance as a way of diagnosing and monitoring congenital defects of the fetus because it is able to provide more diagnostic information than ultrasound and it lacks the ionizing radiation of CT. MRI without contrast agents is the imaging mode of choice for pre-surgical, in-utero diagnosis and evaluation of fetal tumors, primarily teratomas, facilitating open fetal surgery, other fetal interventions, and planning for procedures (such as the EXIT procedure) to safely deliver and treat babies whose defects would otherwise be fatal.

== Claustrophobia and discomfort ==
Although painless, MRI scans may be unpleasant for those who are claustrophobic or otherwise uncomfortable with the imaging device surrounding them. Older closed bore MRI systems have a fairly long tube or tunnel. The part of the body being imaged must lie at the center of the magnet, which is at the absolute center of the tunnel. Because scan times on these older scanners may be long (occasionally up to 40 minutes for the entire procedure), people with even mild claustrophobia are sometimes unable to tolerate an MRI scan without management. Some modern scanners have larger bores (up to 70 cm) and scan times are shorter. A 1.5 T wide short bore scanner increases the examination success rate in patients with claustrophobia and substantially reduces the need for anesthesia-assisted MRI examinations even when claustrophobia is severe.

Alternative scanner designs, such as open or upright systems, may be helpful where these are available. Although open scanners have increased in popularity, they produce inferior scan quality because they operate at lower magnetic fields than closed scanners. Commercial 1.5-tesla open systems have become available recently, however, providing much better image quality than previous lower field strength open models.

Mirror glasses may be used to help create the illusion of openness. The mirrors are angled at 45 degrees, allowing the patient to look down their body and out the end of the imaging area. The appearance is of an open tube pointing upward (as seen when lying in the imaging area). Even though one is able to see around the glasses and the proximity of the device is very evident, this illusion is quite persuasive and relieves the claustrophobic feeling.

For young children who cannot hold still or would be frightened during the examination, chemical sedation or general anesthesia are the norm. Some hospitals encourage children to pretend the MRI machine is a spaceship or other adventure. Certain hospitals with Children's wards have decorated scanners for this purpose, such as that at the Boston Children's Hospital, which operates a scanner with a special casing designed to resemble a sandcastle.

Obese patients and pregnant women may find the MRI machine a tight fit. Pregnant women in the third trimester also may have difficulty lying on their backs for an hour or more without moving.

== MRI versus CT ==
MRI and computed tomography (CT) are complementary imaging technologies and each has advantages and limitations for particular applications. CT is more widely used than MRI in OECD countries with a mean of 132 vs. 46 exams per 1000 population performed respectively. A concern is the potential for CT to contribute to radiation-induced cancer and in 2007 it was estimated that 0.4% of current cancers in the United States were due to CTs performed in the past, and that in the future this figure may rise to 1.5–2% based on historical rates of CT usage. An Australian study found that one in every 1800 CT scans was associated with an excess cancer. An advantage of MRI is that no ionizing radiation is used and so it is recommended over CT when either approach could yield the same diagnostic information. Although the cost of MRI has fallen, making it more competitive with CT, there are not many common imaging scenarios in which MRI can simply replace CT, however, this substitution has been suggested for the imaging of liver disease. The effect of low doses of radiation on carcinogenesis also are disputed. Although MRI is associated with biological effects, these have not been proven to cause measurable harm.

Iodinated contrast medium is routinely used in CT and the main adverse events are anaphylactoid reactions and nephrotoxicity. Commonly used MRI contrast agents have a good safety profile, but linear non-ionic agents in particular have been implicated in nephrogenic systemic fibrosis in patients with severely impaired renal function.

MRI is contraindicated in the presence of MR-unsafe implants, and although these patients may be imaged with CT, beam hardening artefact from metallic devices, such as pacemakers and implantable cardioverter-defibrillators, also may affect image quality. MRI is a longer investigation than CT and an exam may take between 20 and 40 minutes depending on complexity.

== Guidance ==
Safety issues, including the potential for biostimulation device interference, movement of ferromagnetic bodies, and incidental localized heating, have been addressed in the American College of Radiology's White Paper on MR Safety, which originally was published in 2002 and expanded in 2004. The ACR White Paper on MR Safety has been rewritten and was released early in 2007 under the new title ACR Guidance Document for Safe MR Practices.

In December 2007, the Medicines and Healthcare products Regulatory Agency (MHRA), a UK healthcare regulatory body, issued their Safety Guidelines for Magnetic Resonance Imaging Equipment in Clinical Use. In February 2008, the Joint Commission, a U.S. healthcare accrediting organization, issued a Sentinel Event Alert #38, their highest patient safety advisory, on MRI safety issues. In 2020, the United States Veterans Administration, a federal governmental agency serving the healthcare needs of former military personnel, issued the "Imaging Services Design Guide", that includes physical and facility safety considerations for MRI suite planning, along with design considerations for other radiology modalities.

== MRI safety resources ==
There are a number of education and training resources on MRI safety for those involved in the profession. These include:

- The MRI Technologist's MRI Safety Handbook – This 2025 publication by authors Tobias Gilk, Doug Boyd, and Pete Jablonka, is geared towards MRI technologist / radiographer trainees and early-career professionals.
- MRI Bioeffects, Safety, and Patient Management: 2nd Edition – An anthology of chapters by various authors edited by Frank Shellock, John Crues, and Alexandra Karacozoff, addresses multiple different technical aspects of MRI safety and clinical implications.
- Essentials of MRI Safety – A physics-focused treatment of MRI safety authored by Donald McRobbie.
- An Encyclopedia Of Concepts In MRI Safety: A Reference For The MRSO, MRMD, and MRSE – A resource / reference for many central concepts of MRI safety authored by E. Wrenn Wooten.
- MRI-related FDA adverse event reports: A 10-yr review – A paper on the nature and frequency of MRI-classified adverse events reported to the US FDA, authored by Jana Delfino, Daniel Krainak, Stephanie Flesher, and Donald Miller.

== The European Directive on electromagnetic fields ==
This Directive (2013/35/EU – electromagnetic fields) covers all known direct biophysical effects and indirect effects caused by electromagnetic fields within the EU and repealed the 2004/40/EC directive. The deadline for implementation of the new directive was 1 July 2016. Article 10 of the directive sets out the scope of the derogation for MRI, stating that the exposure limits may be exceeded during "the installation, testing, use, development, maintenance of or research related to magnetic resonance imaging (MRI) equipment for patients in the health sector, provided that certain conditions are met." Uncertainties remain regarding the scope and conditions of this derogation.
