= Clastogen =

Substance that can cause breaks in chromosomes

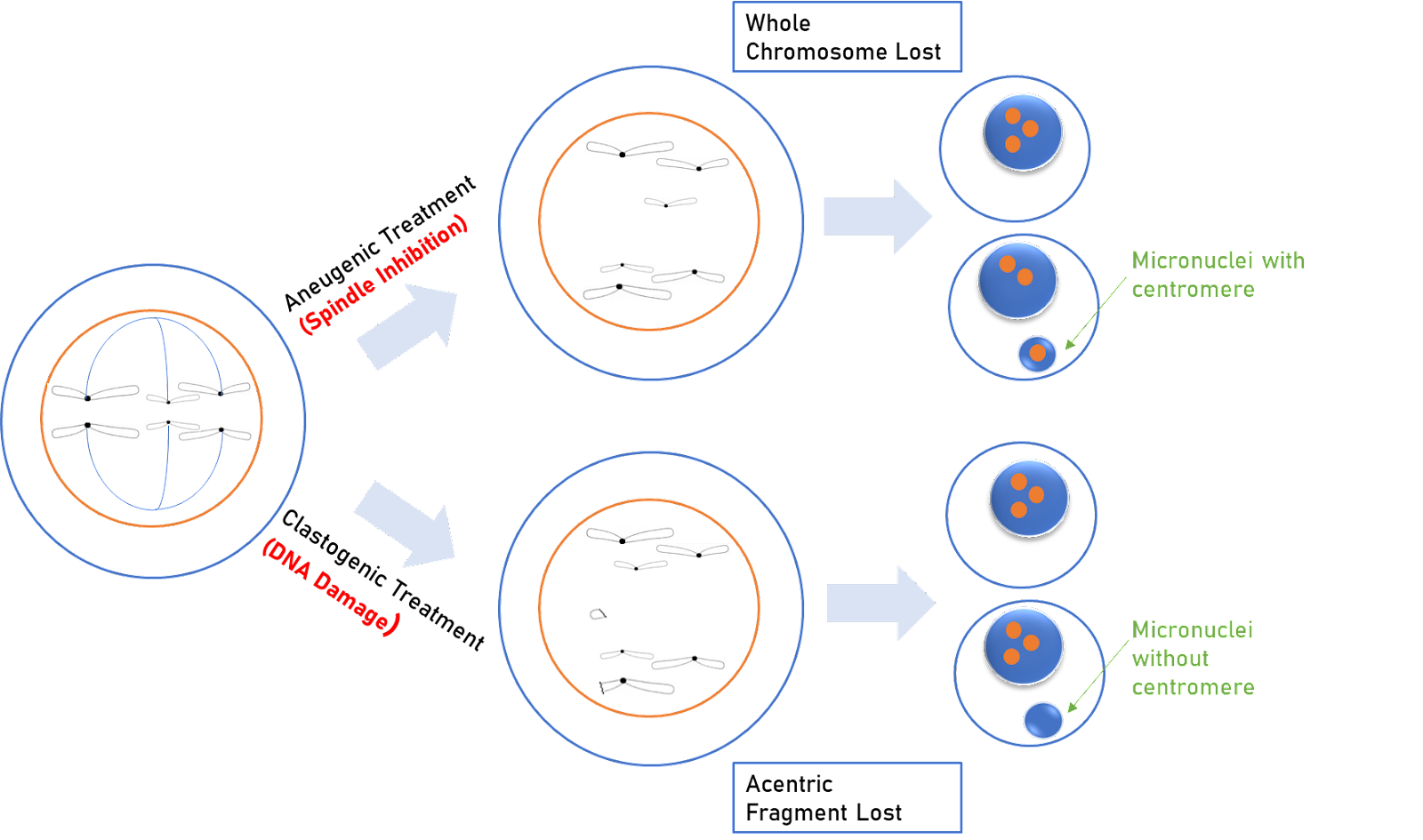
Figure comparing the effects of exposure to genotoxic agents (aneugens and clastogens) on DNA. Aneugens induce mis-segregation of chromosomes into daughter cells while clastogens break the DNA and chromosome.

A clastogen is a mutagenic agent that disturbs normal DNA related processes or directly causes DNA strand breakages, thus causing the deletion, insertion, or rearrangement of entire chromosome sections. These processes are a form of mutagenesis which if left unrepaired, or improperly repaired, can lead to cancer. Known clastogens include acridine yellow, benzene, ethylene oxide, arsenic, phosphine, mimosine, actinomycin D, camptothecin, methotrexate, methyl acrylate, resorcinol and 5-fluorodeoxyuridine. Additionally, 1,2-dimethylhydrazine is a known colon carcinogen and shows signs of possessing clastogenic activity. There are many clastogens not listed here and research is ongoing to discover new clastogens. Some known clastogens only exhibit clastogenic activity in certain cell types, such as caffeine which exhibits clastogenic activity in plant cells. Researchers are interested in clastogens for researching cancer, as well as for other human health concerns such as the inheritability of clastogen effected paternal germ cells that lead to fetus developmental defects.

== Mechanism ==
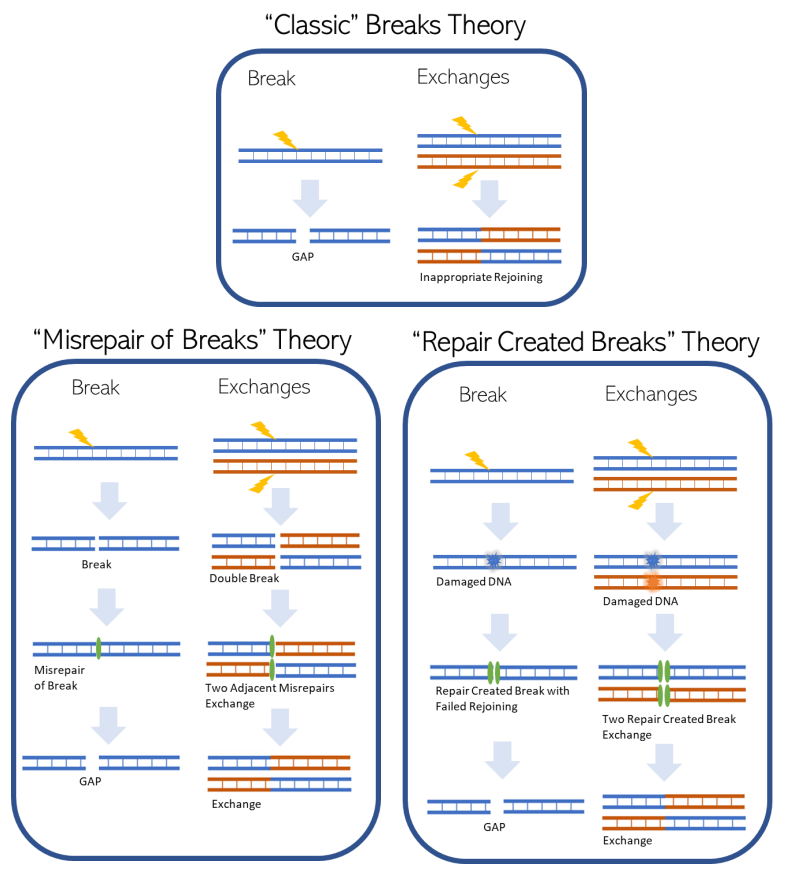
Summary of theories of the mechanisms of chromosomal aberrations: A, ‘classic’ breaks theory; B, ‘mis-repair of breaks’ theory; C, ‘repair-created breaks’ theory. Adapted from Bignold.

There is not one all encompassing method by which clastogens damage chromosomal DNA, instead different clastogens have unique ways they interact with DNA, or DNA associated proteins, and disrupt normal function. Broadly these different types of clastogenic activity can be organized into three classes: ‘classic’ breaks theory; ‘mis-repair of breaks’ theory and ‘repair-created breaks’ theory. It may not always be known how a clastogen causes chromosomal damage.

Radiation was the earliest known clastogen that caused direct DNA damage, following the classic breaks theory. DNA is frequently damaged and there are many DNA repair pathways that combat this, but repair does not always work perfectly resulting in mistakes (called a misrepair). A widely studied class of clastogens are alkylating agents which do not break DNA at all, but instead form DNA adducts, and these have often eluded the common theories for DNA breaks leading to misrepair. The final theory encompasses clastogens that do not interact with DNA but instead impair DNA synthesis proteins or DNA repair proteins causing damage to occur through loss of normal function of the protein.

Clastogen damage in certain areas of the chromosome can lead to instability, such as loss or damage to telomeres. Studies have shown that rat cells that were exposed to chemical clastogens express telomeric irregularities in function and can remain for several cell generations after treatment has been attempted.

== Detection ==
There are many different methods for testing for clastogenic activity. Two of the most common methods are listed below, but this is not a comprehensive guide.

There have been studies done that work with the usage of the deletion (DEL) assay to screen for clastogens.

The micronucleus test is another type of assay that uses gut cells to observe clastogens, and there are a few different types. The micronucleus test on gut cells is useful because in the case of the bone marrow micronucleus test there is not much activity seen after there has been oral exposure therefore more activity is seen in the gut cells. In vitro micronucleus assay (IVMN) can screen for clastogen activity, this method is useful because it can pick up clastogen activity and be used to foresee chromosome aberration activity. The IVMN assay can pick up on fragments that were membrane bound to DNA that were split from nuclei throughout the process of cell division.

These assays are time-consuming so novel methods for monitoring clastogens and aneuploidogens are highly desirable. One example is the use of the monochromosomal hybrid cell for the detection of mis-segregating chromosomes.

== Telomeres ==
There is a possibility of clastogens affecting telomeres. There can be uncertainty with telomeres that occur short term during the first round of cell division in which there can be chromosomal damage by clastogens. Clastogens (which break chromosomes) contribute to telomeric instability because it leads to chromosome end loss or true telomere loss. Clastogens can bring on issues with telomeres and cause them to fail to function as intended, most often seen anomalies are seen to occur in human lymphocytes, cancer cell lines, and non-human established cell lines where there is telomere loss and copies of anomalies in the exposed cells, thus, the problems that arise in telomeres can be duplicated and seen in exposed cells.

In addition, studies have shown that rat cells that were exposed to chemical clastogens express telomeric irregularities in function and can remain for several cell generations after treatment has been attempted.

== Research ==
In terms of resistance, to the specific clastogen Zeocin, an amino acid residue known as XLF-L115D mutant is flawed in terms of being resistant thus the clastogen activity shows no amount of decreasing.

In plants and mice cells studies have found that purine receptor agonists adenosine, ATP, ADP, cyclohexyladenosine, phenylisopropyladenosine and dimethylaminopurine riboside can lower the amount of clastogen damage seen in chromosomes and reduce the amount of micronuclei affected brought on by ethyl methanesulfonate and cyclophosphamide. Some ligands more than others can stop or reduce the clastogen activity of ethyl methanesulfonate such as adenosine, ADP or DAP.

In a study where rats were treated with Brevetoxin B (PbTx2), there was a noticeable 2-3 fold growth in the amount of DNA seen in comet tails which tell us that Brevetoxin B shows in vivo clastogenic activity. This clastogen activity was seen after Brevetoxin B was injected by way of intratracheal administering in the rat.
