= Genotoxicity =

Concept in toxicology

Genotoxicity is the property of chemical agents that damage the genetic information within a cell causing mutations, which may lead to cancer. While genotoxicity is often confused with mutagenicity, all mutagens are genotoxic, but some genotoxic substances are not mutagenic. The alteration can have direct or indirect effects on the DNA: the induction of mutations, mistimed event activation, and direct DNA damage leading to mutations. The permanent, heritable changes can affect either somatic cells of the organism or germ cells to be passed on to future generations. Cells prevent expression of the genotoxic mutation by either DNA repair or apoptosis; however, the damage may not always be fixed leading to mutagenesis.

To assay for genotoxic molecules, researchers assay for DNA damage in cells exposed to the toxic substrates. This DNA damage can be in the form of single- and double-strand breaks, loss of excision repair, cross-linking, alkali-labile sites, point mutations, and structural and numerical chromosomal aberrations. The compromised integrity of the genetic material has been known to cause cancer. As a consequence, many sophisticated techniques including Ames Assay, in vitro and in vivo Toxicology Tests, and Comet Assay have been developed to assess the chemicals' potential to cause DNA damage that may lead to cancer.

== Mechanism ==
Definition of transitions and transversions. They are a common mutation caused by genotoxic compounds.

Genotoxic substances induce damage to the genetic material in the cells through interactions with the DNA sequence and structure. For example, the transition metal chromium interacts with DNA in its high-valent oxidation state, incurring DNA lesions which lead to carcinogenesis. The metastable oxidation state Cr(V) is achieved through reductive activation. Researchers performed an experiment to study the interaction between DNA with the carcinogenic chromium by using a Cr(V)-Salen complex at the specific oxidation state. The interaction was specific to the guanine nucleotide in the genetic sequence. In order to narrow the interaction between the Cr(V)-Salen complex with the guanine base, the researchers modified the bases to 8-oxo-G so to have site specific oxidation. The reaction between the two molecules caused DNA lesions; the two lesions observed at the modified base site were guanidinohydantoin and spiroiminodihydantoin. To further analyze the site of lesion, it was observed that polymerase stopped at the site and adenine was inappropriately incorporated into the DNA sequence opposite of the 8-oxo-G base. Therefore, these lesions predominately contain G→T transversions. High-valent chromium is seen to act as a carcinogen as researchers found that "the mechanism of damage and base oxidation products for the interaction between high-valent chromium and DNA... are relevant to in vivo formation of DNA damage leading to cancer in chromate-exposed human populations". Consequently, it shows how high-valent chromium can act as a carcinogen with 8-oxo-G forming xenobiotics.

Another example of a genotoxic substance causing DNA damage are pyrrolizidine alkaloids (PAs). These substances are found mainly in plant species and are poisonous to animals, including humans; about half of them have been identified as genotoxic and many as tumorigenic. The researchers concluded from testing that when metabolically activated, "PAs produce DNA adducts, DNA cross-linking, DNA breaks, sister chromatid exchange, micronuclei, chromosomal aberrations, gene mutations, and chromosome mutations in vivo and in vitro." The most common mutation within the genes are G:C → T:A tranversions and tandem base substitution. The pyrrolizidine alkaloids are mutagenic in vivo and in vitro and, therefore, responsible for the carcinogenesis prominently in the liver. Comfrey is an example of a plant species that contains fourteen different PAs. The active metabolites interact with DNA to cause DNA damage, mutation induction, and cancer development in liver endothelial cells and hepatocytes. The researchers discovered in the end that the "comfrey is mutagenic in liver, and PA contained in comfrey appear to be responsible for comfrey-induced toxicity and tumor induction,".

== Test techniques ==
The purpose of genotoxicity testing is to determine if a substrate will influence genetic material or may cause cancer. They can be performed in bacterial, yeast, and mammalian cells. With the knowledge from the tests, one can control early development of vulnerable organisms to genotoxic substances.

=== Bacterial Reverse Mutation Assay ===
The Bacterial Reverse Mutation Assay, also known as the Ames Assay, is used in laboratories to test for gene mutation. The technique uses many different bacterial strains in order to compare the different changes in the genetic material. The result of the test detects the majority of genotoxic carcinogens and genetic changes; the types of mutations detected are frame shifts and base substitutions.

Ames test procedure to test for gene mutations present in the various bacterial strains

== in vitro toxicology testing ==
The purpose of in vitro testing is to determine whether a substrate, product, or environmental factor induces genetic damage. One technique entails cytogenetic assays using different mammalian cells. The types of aberrations detected in cells affected by a genotoxic substance are chromatid and chromosome gaps, chromosome breaks, chromatid deletions, fragmentation, translocation, complex rearrangements, and many more. The clastogenic or aneugenic effects from the genotoxic damage will cause an increase in frequency of structural or numerical aberrations of the genetic material. This is similar to the micronucleus test and chromosome aberration assay, which detect structural and numerical chromosomal aberrations in mammalian cells.

In a specific mammalian tissue, one can perform a mouse lymphoma TK+/- assay to test for changes in the genetic material. Gene mutations are commonly point mutations, altering only one base within the genetic sequence to alter the ensuing transcript and amino acid sequence; these point mutations include base substitutions, deletions, frame-shifts, and rearrangements. Also, chromosomes' integrity may be altered through chromosome loss and clastogenic lesions causing multiple gene and multilocus deletions. The specific type of damage is determined by the size of the colonies, distinguishing between genetic mutations (mutagens) and chromosomal aberrations (clastogens).

The SOS/umu assay test evaluates the ability of a substance to induce DNA damage; it is based on the alterations in the induction of the SOS response due to DNA damage. The benefits of this technique are that it is a fast and simple method and convenient for numerous substances. These techniques are performed on water and wastewater in the environment.

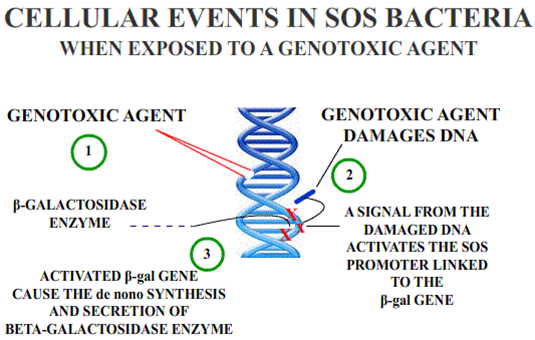
Overview of the use of the SOS response for genotoxicity testing

=== in vivo testing ===
The purpose for in vivo testing is to determine the potential of DNA damage that can affect chromosomal structure or disturb the mitotic apparatus that changes chromosome number; the factors that could influence the genotoxicity are ADME and DNA repair. It can also detect genotoxic agents missed in in vitro tests. The positive result of induced chromosomal damage is an increase in frequency of micronucelated PCEs. A micronucleus is a small structure separate from the nucleus containing nuclear DNA arisen from DNA fragments or whole chromosomes that were not incorporated in the daughter cell during mitosis. Causes for this structure are mitotic loss of acentric chromosomal fragments (clastogenicity), mechanical problems from chromosomal breakage and exchange, mitotic loss of chromosomes (aneugenicity), and apoptosis. The micronucleus test in vivo is similar to the in vitro one because it tests for structural and numerical chromosomal aberrations in mammalian cells, especially in rats' blood cells.

=== Comet assay ===
Comet assays are one of the most common tests for genotoxicity. The technique involves lysing cells using detergents and salts. The DNA released from the lysed cell is electrophoresed in an agarose gel under neutral pH conditions. Cells containing DNA with an increased number of double-strand breaks will migrate more quickly to the anode. This technique is advantageous in that it detects low levels of DNA damage, requires only a very small number of cells, is cheaper than many techniques, is easy to execute, and quickly displays results. However, it does not identify the mechanism underlying the genotoxic effect or the exact chemical or chemical component causing the breaks.

== Cancer ==
Genotoxic effects such as deletions, breaks and/or rearrangements can lead to cancer if the damage does not immediately lead to cell death. Regions sensitive to breakage, called fragile sites, may result from genotoxic agents (such as pesticides). Some chemicals have the ability to induce fragile sites in regions of the chromosome where oncogenes are present, which could lead to carcinogenic effects. In keeping with this finding, occupational exposure to some mixtures of pesticides are positively correlated with increased genotoxic damage in the exposed individuals. DNA damage is not uniform in its severity across populations because Individuals vary in their ability to activate or detoxify genotoxic substances, which leads to variability in the incidence of cancer among individuals. The difference in ability to detoxify certain compounds is due to individuals' inherited polymorphisms of genes involved in the metabolism of the chemical. Differences may also be attributed to individual variation in efficiency of DNA repair mechanisms.

The metabolism of some chemicals results in the production of reactive oxygen species (ROS), which is a possible mechanism of genotoxicity. This is seen in the metabolism of arsenic, which produces hydroxyl radicals, which are known to cause genotoxic effects. Similarly, ROS have been implicated in genotoxicity caused by particles and fibers. Genotoxicity of nonfibrous and fibrous particles is characterized by high production of ROS from inflammatory cells.

=== Genotoxins implicated in the four most common cancers worldwide ===
Major genotoxic agents responsible for the four most common cancers worldwide (lung, breast, colon and stomach) have been identified.

Lung cancer is the most frequent cancer in the world, both in terms of yearly cases (1.61 million cases; 12.7% of all cancer cases) and deaths (1.38 million deaths; 18.2% of all cancer deaths). Tobacco smoke is the main cause of lung cancer. Risk estimates for lung cancer indicate that tobacco smoke is responsible for 90% of lung cancers in the United States. Tobacco smoke contains more than 5,300 identified chemicals. The most significant carcinogens in tobacco smoke have been determined by a "Margin of Exposure" approach. By this approach, the tumorigenic compounds in tobacco smoke were, in order of importance, acrolein, formaldehyde, acrylonitrile, 1,3-butadiene, cadmium, acetaldehyde, ethylene oxide, and isoprene. In general, these compounds are genotoxic and cause DNA damage. As examples, DNA damaging effects have been reported for acrolein, formaldehyde, and acrylonitrile.

Breast cancer is the second most frequent cancer worldwide on a yearly basis [(1.38 million cases, 10.9% of all cancer cases), and ranks 5th as cause of death (458,000, 6.1% of all cancer deaths)]. Breast cancer risk is associated with persistently high blood levels of estrogen. Estrogen likely contributes to breast carcinogenesis by the following three processes; (1) metabolic conversion of estrogen to genotoxic, mutagenic carcinogens, (2) stimulation of growth of tissues, and (3) repression of phase II detoxification enzymes that metabolize genotoxic reactive oxygen species, thus resulting in increased oxidative DNA damage. The principal human estrogen, estradiol, can be metabolized to quinone derivatives that form DNA adducts. These derivatives can cause the removal of bases from the phosphodiester backbone of DNA (e.g. depurination). This removal may be followed by inaccurate repair or replication of the apurinic site leading to mutation and eventually cancer.

Colorectal cancer is the third most frequent cancer worldwide [1.23 million cases (9.7% of all cancer cases), 608,000 deaths (8.0% of all cancer deaths)]. In the United States, tobacco smoke may be responsible for up to 20% of colorectal cancers. In addition, bile acids are implicated by substantial evidence as an important genotoxic factor in colon cancer. In particular, the bile acid deoxycholic acid causes the production of DNA-damaging reactive oxygen species in human and rodent colon epithelial cells.

Stomach cancer is the fourth most common cancer worldwide [990,000 cases (7.8% of all cancer cases), 738,000 deaths (9.7% of all cancer deaths)]. Infection by Helicobacter pylori is the main causative factor in stomach cancer. Chronic inflammation due to H. pylori, if untreated, is often long-standing. H. pylori infection of gastric epithelial cells causes increased production of genotoxic reactive oxygen species (ROS). ROS cause oxidative damage to DNA that includes the major base alteration 8-Oxo-2'-deoxyguanosine. In a recent retrospective study it was found that use of a bile acid sequestrant was associated with a significant reduction in gastric cancer risk, suggesting that bile acids may be a contributory factor in stomach cancer.

=== Genotoxic chemotherapy ===
Genotoxic chemotherapy is the treatment of cancer with the use of one or more genotoxic drugs. The treatment is traditionally part of standardized regime. By utilizing the destructive properties of genotoxins treatments aims to induce DNA damage into cancer cells. Any damage done to a cancer is passed on to descendent cancer cells as proliferation continues. If this damage is severe enough, it will induce cells to undergo apoptosis.

==== Risks ====
A drawback of treatment is that many genotoxic drugs are effective on cancerous cells and normal cells alike. Selectivity of a particular drug's action is based on the sensitivity of the cells themselves. So, while rapidly dividing cancer cells are particularly sensitive to many drug treatments, often normal functioning cells are affected.

Another risk of treatment is that, in addition to being genotoxic, many of the drugs are also mutagenic and cytotoxic. So the effects of these drugs are not limited to just DNA damage. In addition, some of these drugs that are meant to treat cancers are also carcinogens themselves, raising the risk of secondary cancers, such as leukemia.

==== Different treatments ====
This table depicts different genotoxic-based cancer treatments along with examples.

Treatment	Mechanism	Examples
Alkylating agents	interfere with DNA replication and transcription by modifying DNA bases.	Busulfan, Carmustine, Mechlorethamine
Intercalating agents	interfere with DNA replication and transcription by wedging themselves into the spaces in between DNA's nucleotides	Daunorubicin, Doxorubicin, Epirubicin
Enzyme inhibitors	inhibit enzymes that are crucial to DNA replication	Decitabine, Etoposide, Irinotecan

=== Kidney ===
Genotoxic DNA damage in the kidney has been implicated in both acute and chronic kidney injury, as well as in renal cell carcinoma. Studies of humans with genetic deficiencies in DNA repair pathways have revealed that their kidneys are particularly vulnerable to DNA damages such as DNA crosslinks, DNA breaks and transcription-blocking damage.

== See also ==
- Cancer
- Carcinogen
- Carcinogenesis
- Carcinogenicity
- Dysgenics
- Mutagen
- Mutagenesis
