= Streptomyces stramineus =

Scientific classification
- Domain: Bacteria
- Kingdom: Bacillati
- Phylum: Actinomycetota
- Class: Actinomycetes
- Order: Streptomycetales
- Family: Streptomycetaceae
- Genus: Streptomyces
- Species: S. stramineus

Binomial name
- Streptomyces stramineus Labeda et al. 1997

Type strain
- CIP 105398, DSM 41783, IFO 16131, JCM 10649, LL-B01208, NBRC 16131, NRRL 12292

Species of bacterium

Streptomyces stramineus is a bacterium species from the genus of Streptomyces which has been isolated from American grassland soil. It produces phleomycin.

== See also ==
- List of Streptomyces species
