= Justin Marie Jolly =

French hematologist and histologist

Justin Marie Jolly (August 6, 1870 – February 1, 1953) was a French hematologist and histologist born in Melun, Seine-et-Marne. He was a pioneer in the field of hematology as it pertained to the study of living tissue.

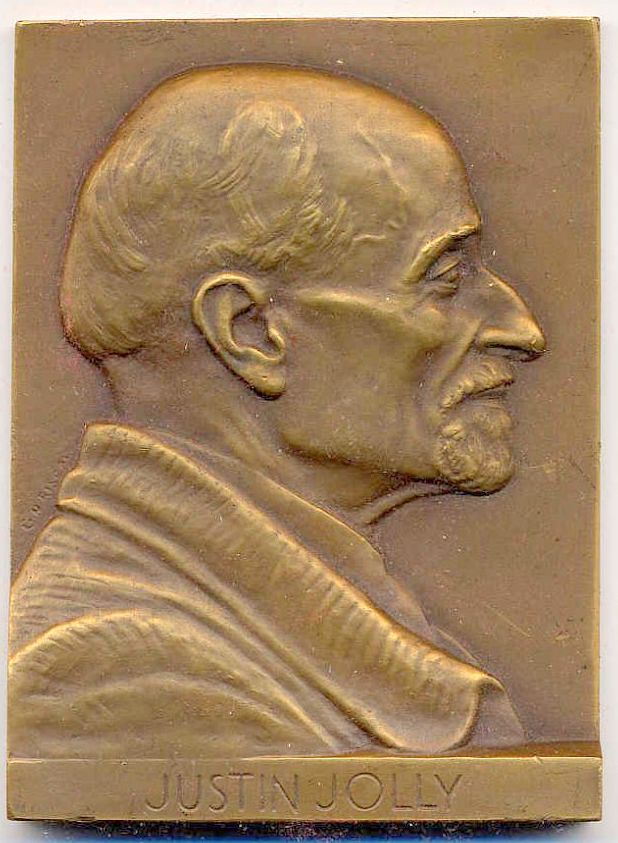
Relief of Justin Jolly

He studied medicine at the Collège de France under Louis-Antoine Ranvier (1835–1922) and Louis-Charles Malassez (1842–1909) where he learned histological techniques and their correlation to other medical disciplines. He was chef du laboratoire at the medical clinic in the Hôtel-Dieu de Paris, and director of the histological laboratory at the École des Hautes Etudes. From 1925 to 1940 he was a professor at the Collège de France.

In the early part of the 20th century he produced the earliest films of mitosis in living cells via "microscopic movies". In 1923 he published an influential textbook on hematology called Traité technique d'hématologie. Along with American physiologist William Henry Howell (1860–1945), the Howell-Jolly bodies are named; which are 1-2 μm granules seen in erythrocytes (red-blood cells).

== Partial bibliography ==
- Sur la formation des globules rouges des mammifères. Comptes rendus de la Société de Biologie, Paris, 1905, 58: 528–531. J.M. Jolly.
- Traité technique d'hématologie, 1923.
