= SOS chromotest =

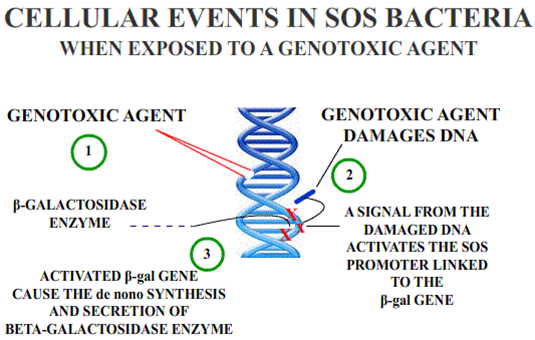
Overview of the use of the SOS response for genotoxicity testing

The SOS chromotest is a biological assay to assess the genotoxic potential of chemical compounds. The test is a colorimetric assay which measures the expression of genes induced by genotoxic agents in Escherichia coli, by means of a fusion with the structural gene for β-galactosidase. The test is performed over a few hours in columns of a 96-well microplate with increasing concentrations of test samples. This test was developed as a practical complement or alternative to the traditional Ames test assay for genotoxicity, which involves growing bacteria on agar plates and comparing natural mutation rates to mutation rates of bacteria exposed to potentially mutagenic compounds or samples. The SOS chromotest is comparable in accuracy and sensitivity to established methods such as the Ames test and is a useful tool to screen genotoxic compounds, which could prove carcinogenic in humans, in order to single out chemicals for further in-depth analysis.

As with other bacterial genotoxicity and mutagenicity assays, compounds requiring metabolic activation for activity can be investigated with the addition of S9 microsomal rat liver extract.

== Mechanism ==
The SOS response plays a central role in the response of E. coli to genotoxic compounds because it responds to a wide array of chemical agents. Triggering of this system can and has been used as an early sign of DNA damage. Two genes play a key role in the SOS response: lexA encodes a repressor for all the genes in the system, and recA encodes a protein able to cleave the LexA repressor upon activation by an SOS inducing signal (caused in this case by the presence of a genotoxic compound). Although the exact mechanism of the SOS response is still unknown, it is induced when DNA lesions perturb or stop DNA replication. .

Various end-points are possible indicators of the triggering of the SOS system; activation of the RecA protein, cleavage of the LexA repressor, expression of any of the SOS genes, etc. One of the simplest assays consists of monitoring the expression of an SOS gene by means of fusion with lacZ, the structural gene for E. coli β-galactosidase.

== Procedure ==
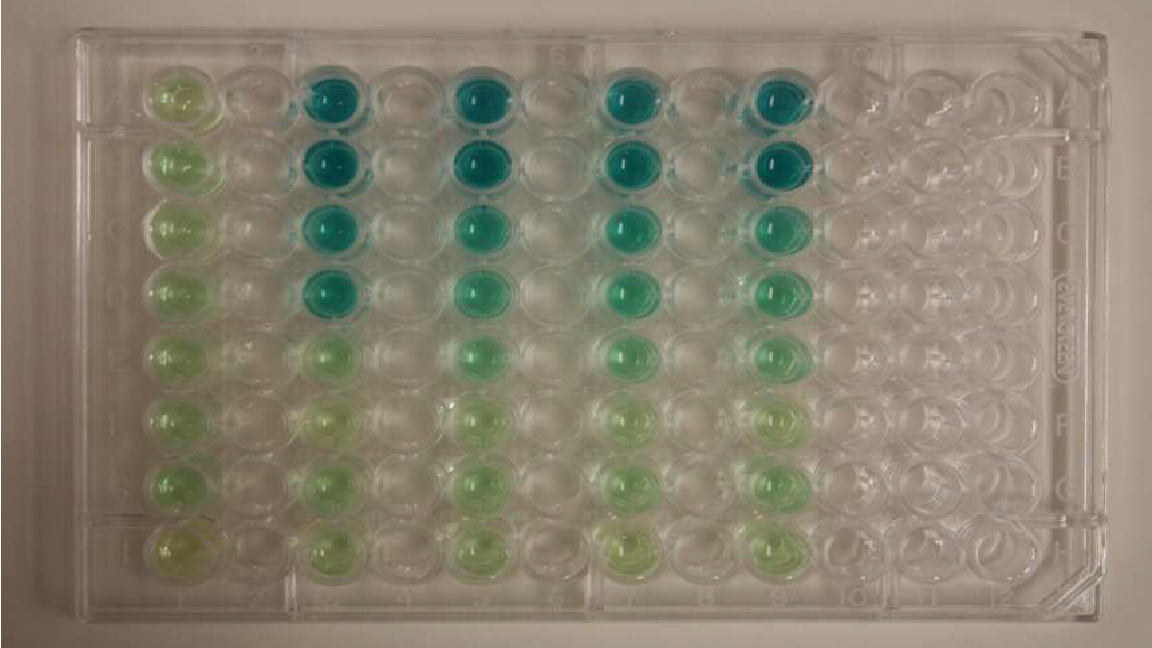
Overview of the use of the SOS response for genotoxicity testing

The SOS chromotest consists of incubating the E. coli with increasing concentrations of the chemical to be tested. After allowing time for protein synthesis, β-galactosidase activity is assayed using a simple colorimetric assay. By including a lactose analog which yields a colored compound upon degradation, an easily observable or quantifiable change in colour is used as a metric. Since the chemical tested may inhibit protein synthesis at higher concentrations, which would lead to an underestimation of B-galactosidase induction, alkaline phosphatase is assayed simultaneously with β-galactosidase in order to scale the data to survivability of the cells.

The assay can easily be completed in a number of hours. If using a micro-plate reader, the test is quantitative and dose-response curves have an initial linear region. The slope of this linear region allows unequivocal association of each compound with a single parameter, the SOS-inducing potency (SOSIP), which reflects the inducing activity of the compound.

This assay provides both a qualitative (visible observation of colour gradient) for screening purposes, or quantitative measurement (spectrophotometry) for calculation of commonly accepted metrics. In the quantitative assay, the dose-response (colour production linked to beta-galactosidase production) of a compound is plotted, with the slope of the initial linear region used as a universal parameter, the SOS-inducing potency (SOSIP), which reflects the ability of a compound to induce the SOS response (measured indirectly through production of beta-galactosidase and the breakdown of a lactose analog). Typically, the lactose analog is X-Gal, which produces a blue colour when cleaved by beta-galactosidase. The dose response is also scaled by the survival of cells, measured through the breakdown of alkaline phosphatase (which produces a yellow colour), allowing for the calculation of the SOSIP.

Although the SOSIP is a concentration-based metric, the same method can be used for complex environmental mixtures where the concentration or even compounds of interest are unknown. Through the calculation of the intermediate SOS-induction factor (SOSIF), which can be plotted against dilution in the same manner in order to give an illustration of the dose-response without analytical measurements of samples beforehand.

== Advantages ==
THE SOS chromotest is considered to be the most simple and rapid short-term test for genotoxicity. It serves as a useful and cost effective complement to the traditional Ames test for a number of reasons. Firstly, because of its simplicity and rapidity, the SOS chromotest may be used as a screening test for a large number of potentially genotoxic compounds. Secondly, it may allow the detection of genotoxic chemicals which yield false negatives in the Ames test (such as estradiol, a compound of growing concern). Thirdly, it can prove an effective method to discriminate false positive results in the Ames test.
