= Acridine yellow =

Dye

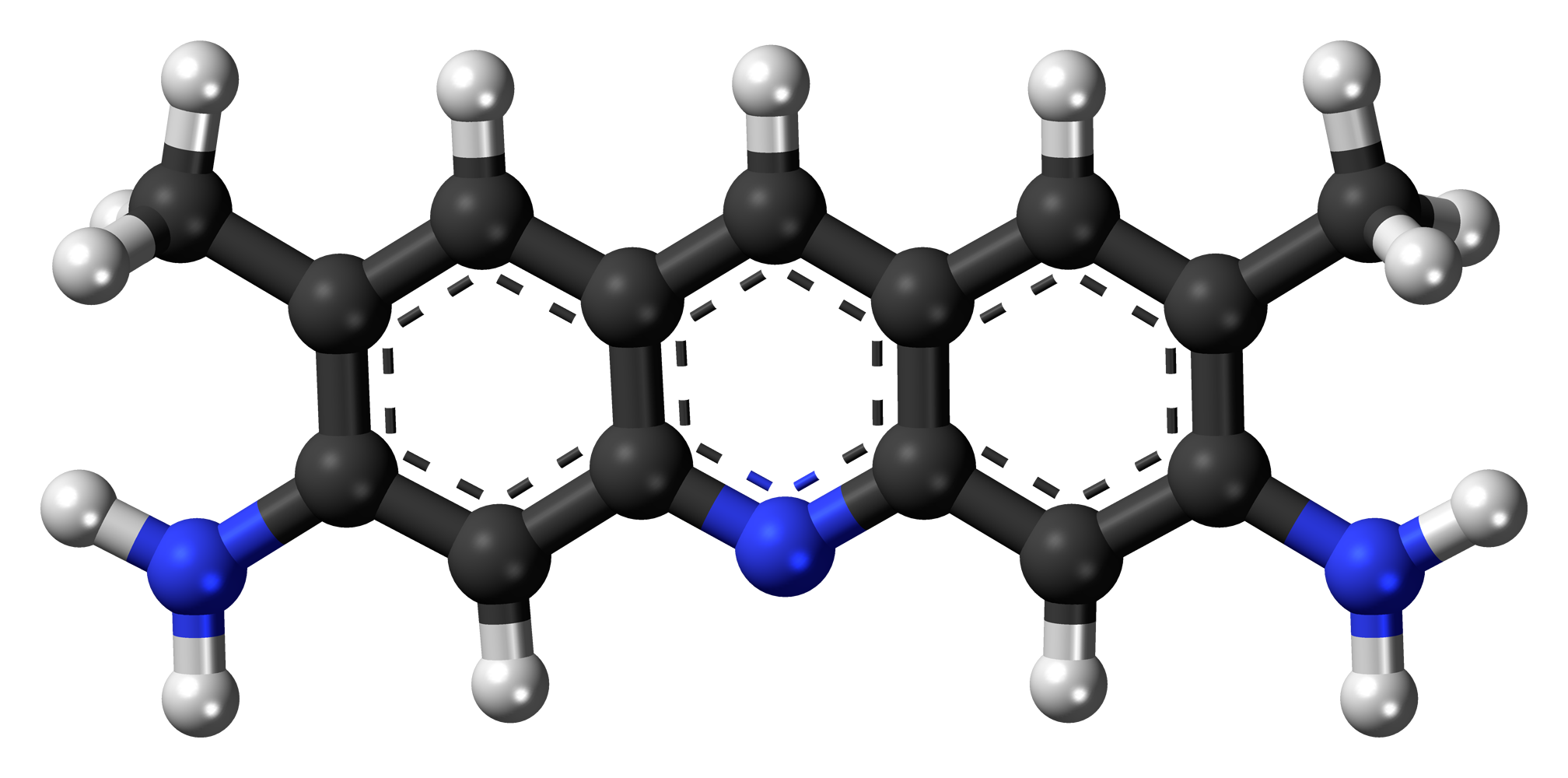

Names
- Preferred IUPAC name 2,7-Dimethylacridine-3,6-diamine
- Other names 2,7-Dimethylproflavine Acridine yellow G Acridine yellow H107 Basic Yellow K

Identifiers
CAS Number	135-49-9
3D model (JSmol)	Interactive image; Interactive image
Beilstein Reference	5-22-11-00340
ChEBI	CHEBI:248841
ChEMBL	ChEMBL329221
ChemSpider	8348
ECHA InfoCard	100.001.947
EC Number	202-141-5
MeSH	Acridine+yellow
PubChem CID	8672
RTECS number	AR8790000
UNII	V0923J4F9K
CompTox Dashboard (EPA)	DTXSID9059046
- InChI: InChI=1/C15H15N3.ClH/c1-8-3-10-5-11-4-9(2)13(17)7-15(11)18-14(10)6-12(8)16;/h3-7H,16-17H2,1-2H3;1H Key: BGLGAKMTYHWWKW-UHFFFAOYAJ; InChI=1S/C15H15N3.ClH/c1-8-3-10-5-11-4-9(2)13(17)7-15(11)18-14(10)6-12(8)16;/h3-7H,16-17H2,1-2H3;1H Key: BGLGAKMTYHWWKW-UHFFFAOYSA-N; InChI=1S/C15H15N3/c1-8-3-10-5-11-4-9(2)13(17)7-15(11)18-14(10)6-12(8)16/h3-7H,16-17H2,1-2H3 Key: HGHJYCKSBMCGRK-UHFFFAOYSA-N
- SMILES: CC1=CC2=CC3=C(C=C(N)C(C)=C3)N=C2C=C1N; Cl.n1c3c(cc2c1cc(N)c(c2)C)cc(c(c3)N)C

Properties
Chemical formula	C_{15}H_{15}N_{3}
Molar mass	237.30 g/mol
Appearance	Brown/red crystals

Hazards
- GHS labelling
Pictograms	(GHS07: Exclamation mark) (GHS08: Health hazard)
Signal word	Warning
Hazard statements	H302, H312, H315, H319, H332, H335, H351
Precautionary statements	P201, P202, P261, P264, P270, P271, P280, P281, P301+P312, P302+P352, P304+P312, P304+P340, P305+P351+P338, P308+P313, P312, P321, P322, P330, P332+P313, P337+P313, P362, P363, P403+P233, P405, P501
NFPA 704 (fire diamond)	2 1 0
- Except where otherwise noted, data are given for materials in their standard state (at 25 °C [77 °F], 100 kPa). verify (what is ?) Infobox references

Acridine yellow, also known as acridine yellow G, acridine yellow H107, basic yellow K, and 3,6-diamino-2,7-dimethylacridine, is a yellow dye with strong bluish-green fluorescence. It is a derivate of acridine. In histology, it is used as a fluorescent stain, and as a fluorescent probe for non-invasive measurements of cytoplasmic pH changes in whole cells. It is also used as a topical antiseptic. It is usually available as a hydrochloride salt. Acridine yellow damages DNA and is used as a mutagen in microbiology.

Acridine yellow is similar to acridine orange.

According to a publication by Karl Drechsler, a student of Guido Goldschmiedt at the Imperial and Royal University of Vienna, Moriz Freund discovered the substance in 1896 during experiments at the University of Prague. Drechsler was then able to produce the substance in larger quantities and subsequently also examine it more closely.
