= Zeocin =

Names
- Systematic IUPAC name (2^{4}R,7S,10S,11S,12R,15S,16R,18^{2}R,18^{3}S,18^{4}S,18^{5}S,18^{6}S,19^{2}R,19^{3}S,19^{4}S,19^{5}R,19^{6}R)-15-{6-Amino-2-[(1S)-3-amino-1-{[(2S)-2,3-diamino-3-oxopropyl]amino}-3-oxopropyl]-5-methylpyrimidine-4-carboxamido}-1^{4}-({4-[(diaminomethylidene)amino]butyl}carbamoyl)-11,18^{4},18^{5},20^{3},20^{5}-pentahydroxy-7-[(1R)-1-hydroxyethyl]-18^{6},20^{6}-bis(hydroxymethyl)-16-(1H-imidazol-5-yl)-10,12-dimethyl-6,9,14-trioxo-2^{4},2^{5}-dihydro-17,19-dioxa-5,8,13-triaza-1(2),2(4,2)-bis([1,3]thiazola)-18(2,3),20(2)-bis(oxana)icosaphan-20^{4}-yl carbamate

Identifiers
CAS Number	11031-11-1
3D model (JSmol)	Interactive image
ChEBI	CHEBI:75046
ChemSpider	140128
PubChem CID	159333
UNII	O0VC1NEK5M
CompTox Dashboard (EPA)	DTXSID301336409
- InChI: InChI=1S/C55H86N20O21S2/c1-19-32(72-45(75-43(19)58)24(11-30(57)79)67-12-23(56)44(59)85)49(89)74-34(40(25-13-63-18-68-25)94-53-42(38(83)36(81)28(14-76)93-53)95-52-39(84)41(96-55(62)91)37(82)29(15-77)92-52)50(90)69-21(3)35(80)20(2)46(86)73-33(22(4)78)48(88)65-10-7-31-70-27(17-97-31)51-71-26(16-98-51)47(87)64-8-5-6-9-66-54(60)61/h13,16,18,20-24,27-29,33-42,52-53,67,76-78,80-84H,5-12,14-15,17,56H2,1-4H3,(H2,57,79)(H2,59,85)(H2,62,91)(H,63,68)(H,64,87)(H,65,88)(H,69,90)(H,73,86)(H,74,89)(H2,58,72,75)(H4,60,61,66) Key: CWCMIVBLVUHDHK-UHFFFAOYSA-N; InChI=1/C55H86N20O21S2/c1-19-32(72-45(75-43(19)58)24(11-30(57)79)67-12-23(56)44(59)85)49(89)74-34(40(25-13-63-18-68-25)94-53-42(38(83)36(81)28(14-76)93-53)95-52-39(84)41(96-55(62)91)37(82)29(15-77)92-52)50(90)69-21(3)35(80)20(2)46(86)73-33(22(4)78)48(88)65-10-7-31-70-27(17-97-31)51-71-26(16-98-51)47(87)64-8-5-6-9-66-54(60)61/h13,16,18,20-24,27-29,33-42,52-53,67,76-78,80-84H,5-12,14-15,17,56H2,1-4H3,(H2,57,79)(H2,59,85)(H2,62,91)(H,63,68)(H,64,87)(H,65,88)(H,69,90)(H,73,86)(H,74,89)(H2,58,72,75)(H4,60,61,66) Key: CWCMIVBLVUHDHK-UHFFFAOYAG
- SMILES: CC1=C(N=C(N=C1N)[C@H](CC(=O)N)NC[C@@H](C(=O)N)N)C(=O)N[C@@H]([C@H](C2=CN=CN2)O[C@H]3[C@H]([C@H]([C@@H]([C@@H](O3)CO)O)O)O[C@@H]4[C@H]([C@H]([C@@H]([C@H](O4)CO)O)OC(=O)N)O)C(=O)N[C@H](C)[C@H]([C@H](C)C(=O)N[C@@H]([C@@H](C)O)C(=O)NCCC5=N[C@H](CS5)C6=NC(=CS6)C(=O)NCCCCN=C(N)N)O

Properties
Chemical formula	C_{55}H_{86}N_{20}O_{21}S_{2}
Molar mass	1427.53 g·mol^{−1}
- Except where otherwise noted, data are given for materials in their standard state (at 25 °C [77 °F], 100 kPa). Infobox references

Zeocin is a trade name for a formulation of phleomycin D1, a glycopeptide antibiotic and one of the phleomycins from Streptomyces verticillus belonging to the bleomycin family of antibiotics. It is a broad-spectrum antibiotic that is effective against most aerobic organisms including bacteria, filamentous fungi, yeast, plant, and animal cells. It causes cell death by intercalating into DNA and inducing double stranded breaks of the DNA.

Zeocin is a registered trademark belonging to InvivoGen.

== Properties ==
Zeocin is blue in colour due to the presence of copper ion Cu^{2+}. This copper-chelated form is inactive. When Zeocin enters a cell, the Cu^{2+} is reduced to Cu^{+} and then removed. Subsequently, Zeocin becomes activated and can then bind and cleave DNA. However, the mechanism of action is not yet fully understood.

== Usage ==
Zeocin and other related chemicals in the bleomycin family of compounds are primarily used in molecular biology as an antibiotic, especially for the selection of eukaryotic cell lines when used in conjunction with vectors containing a selectable marker for Zeocin resistance. Zeocin is considerably cheaper than phleomycin, works better in minimal media, and is therefore often used preferentially in studies.

Resistance to Zeocin is conferred by the product of the Sh ble gene first isolated from Streptoalloteichus hindustanus. The Sh ble gene product binds the antibiotic in a one-to-one ratio so it can no longer cause cleavage of DNA. This resistance gene is used as a selectable marker in some cloning and expression vectors where Zeocin is used as the antibiotic for selection.

== Plasmids with Zeocin Resistance ==
pFUSE-Fc plasmid

pUNO1-Sh ble

pSELECT-zeo

pSELECT-GFPzeo
