= Mutagen =

Physical or chemical agent that increases the rate of genetic mutation

The international pictogram for chemicals that are sensitising, mutagenic, carcinogenic or toxic to reproduction

In genetics, a mutagen is a physical or chemical agent that permanently changes genetic material, usually DNA, in an organism and thus increases the frequency of mutations above the natural background level. As many mutations can cause cancer in animals, such mutagens can therefore be carcinogens, although not all necessarily are. All mutagens have characteristic mutational signatures with some chemicals becoming mutagenic through cellular processes.

The process of DNA becoming modified is called mutagenesis. Not all mutations are caused by mutagens: so-called "spontaneous mutations" occur due to spontaneous hydrolysis, errors in DNA replication, repair and recombination.

== Discovery ==
The first mutagens to be identified were carcinogens, substances that were shown to be linked to cancer. Tumors were described more than 2,000 years before the discovery of chromosomes and DNA; in 500 B.C., the Greek physician Hippocrates named tumors resembling a crab karkinos (from which the word "cancer" is derived via Latin), meaning crab. In 1567, Swiss physician Paracelsus suggested that an unidentified substance in mined ore (identified as radon gas in modern times) caused a wasting disease in miners, and in England, in 1761, John Hill made the first direct link of cancer to chemical substances by noting that excessive use of snuff may cause nasal cancer. In 1775, Sir Percivall Pott wrote a paper on the high incidence of scrotal cancer in chimney sweeps, and suggested chimney soot as the cause of scrotal cancer. In 1915, Yamagawa and Ichikawa showed that repeated application of coal tar to rabbit's ears produced malignant cancer. Subsequently, in the 1930s the carcinogen component in coal tar was identified as a polyaromatic hydrocarbon (PAH), benzo[a]pyrene. Polyaromatic hydrocarbons are also present in soot, which was suggested to be a causative agent of cancer over 150 years earlier.

The association of exposure to radiation and cancer had been observed as early as 1902, six years after the discovery of X-ray by Wilhelm Röntgen and radioactivity by Henri Becquerel. Georgii Nadson and German Filippov were the first who created fungi mutants under ionizing radiation in 1925. The mutagenic property of mutagens was first demonstrated in 1927, when Hermann Muller discovered that x-rays can cause genetic mutations in fruit flies, producing phenotypic mutants as well as observable changes to the chromosomes, visible due to the presence of enlarged "polytene" chromosomes in fruit fly salivary glands. His collaborator Edgar Altenburg also demonstrated the mutational effect of UV radiation in 1928. Muller went on to use x-rays to create Drosophila mutants that he used in his studies of genetics. He also found that X-rays not only mutate genes in fruit flies, but also have effects on the genetic makeup of humans. Similar work by Lewis Stadler also showed the mutational effect of X-rays on barley in 1928, and ultraviolet (UV) radiation on maize in 1936. The effect of sunlight had previously been noted in the nineteenth century where rural outdoor workers and sailors were found to be more prone to skin cancer.

Chemical mutagens were not demonstrated to cause mutation until the 1940s, when Charlotte Auerbach and J. M. Robson found that mustard gas can cause mutations in fruit flies. A large number of chemical mutagens have since been identified, especially after the development of the Ames test in the 1970s by Bruce Ames that screens for mutagens and allows for preliminary identification of carcinogens. Early studies by Ames showed around 90% of known carcinogens can be identified in Ames test as mutagenic (later studies however gave lower figures), and ~80% of the mutagens identified through Ames test may also be carcinogens.

== Difference between mutagens and carcinogens ==
Mutagens are not necessarily carcinogens, and vice versa. Sodium azide for example may be mutagenic (and highly toxic), but it has not been shown to be carcinogenic. Meanwhile, compounds which are not directly mutagenic but stimulate cell growth which can reduce the effectiveness of DNA repair and indirectly increase the chance of mutations, and therefore that of cancer. One example of this would be anabolic steroids, which stimulate growth of the prostate gland and increase the risk of prostate cancer among others. Other carcinogens may cause cancer through a variety of mechanisms without producing mutations, such as tumour promotion, immunosuppression that reduces the ability to fight cancer cells or pathogens that can cause cancer, disruption of the endocrine system (e.g. in breast cancer), tissue-specific toxicity, and inflammation (e.g. in colorectal cancer).

== Difference between mutagens and DNA damaging agents ==
A DNA damaging agent is an agent that causes a change in the structure of DNA that is not necessarily replicated when the DNA is replicated. Examples of DNA damage include a chemical addition or disruption of a nucleotide base in DNA (generating an abnormal nucleotide or nucleotide fragment), or a break in one or both strands in DNA. When duplex DNA containing a damaged base is replicated, an incorrect base may be inserted in the newly synthesized strand opposite the damaged base in the complementary template strand, and this can become a mutation in the next round of replication. Also a DNA double-strand break may be repaired by an inaccurate process leading to an altered base pair, a mutation. However, mutations and DNA damages differ in a fundamental way: mutations can, in principle, be replicated when DNA replicates, whereas DNA damages are not necessarily replicated. Thus DNA damaging agents often cause mutations as a secondary consequence, but not all DNA damages lead to mutation and not all mutations arise from a DNA damage. The term genotoxic means toxic (damaging) to DNA.

== Effects ==
Mutagens can cause changes to the DNA and are therefore genotoxic. They can affect the transcription and replication of the DNA, which in severe cases can lead to cell death. The mutagen produces mutations in the DNA, and deleterious mutation can result in aberrant, impaired or loss of function for a particular gene, and accumulation of mutations may lead to cancer. Mutagens may therefore also be carcinogens. However, some mutagens exert their mutagenic effect through their metabolites, and therefore whether such mutagens actually become carcinogenic may be dependent on the metabolic processes of an organism, and a compound shown to be mutagenic in one organism may not necessarily be carcinogenic in another.

Different mutagens act on DNA differently. Powerful mutagens may result in chromosomal instability, causing chromosomal breakages and rearrangement of the chromosomes such as translocation, deletion, and inversion. Such mutagens are called clastogens. Some mutagens can cause aneuploidy and change the number of chromosomes in the cell. They are known as aneuploidogens or aneugens.

Mutagens may also modify the DNA sequence; the changes in nucleic acid sequences by mutations include substitution of nucleotide base-pairs and insertions and deletions of one or more nucleotides in DNA sequences. Although some of these mutations are lethal or cause serious disease, many have minor effects as they do not result in residue changes that have significant effect on the structure and function of the proteins. Many mutations are silent mutations, causing no visible effects at all, either because they occur in non-coding or non-functional sequences, or they do not change the amino-acid sequence due to the redundancy of codons.

In Ames test, where the varying concentrations of the chemical are used in the test, the dose response curve obtained is nearly always linear, suggesting that there may be no threshold for mutagenesis. Similar results are also obtained in studies with radiations, indicating that there may be no safe threshold for mutagens. However, the no-threshold model is disputed with some arguing for a dose rate dependent threshold for mutagenesis. Some have proposed that low level of some mutagens may stimulate the DNA repair processes and therefore may not necessarily be harmful. More recent approaches with sensitive analytical methods have shown that there may be non-linear or bilinear dose-responses for genotoxic effects, and that the activation of DNA repair pathways can prevent the occurrence of mutation arising from a low dose of mutagen.

== Types of Mutagens ==
Mutagens may be of physical, chemical or biological origin. They may act directly on the DNA, causing direct damage to the DNA, and most often result in replication error. Some however may act on the replication mechanism and chromosomal partition. Many mutagens are not mutagenic by themselves, but can form mutagenic metabolites through cellular processes, for example through the activity of the cytochrome P450 system and other oxygenases such as cyclooxygenase. Such mutagens are called promutagens.

=== Physical mutagens ===
- Ionizing radiations such as X-rays, gamma rays and alpha particles cause DNA breakage and other damages. The most common lab sources include cobalt-60 and cesium-137.
- Ultraviolet radiations with wavelength above 260 nm are absorbed strongly by bases, producing pyrimidine dimers, which can cause error in replication if left uncorrected.
- Radioactive decay, such as ^{14}C in DNA which decays into nitrogen.

=== Chemical mutagens ===
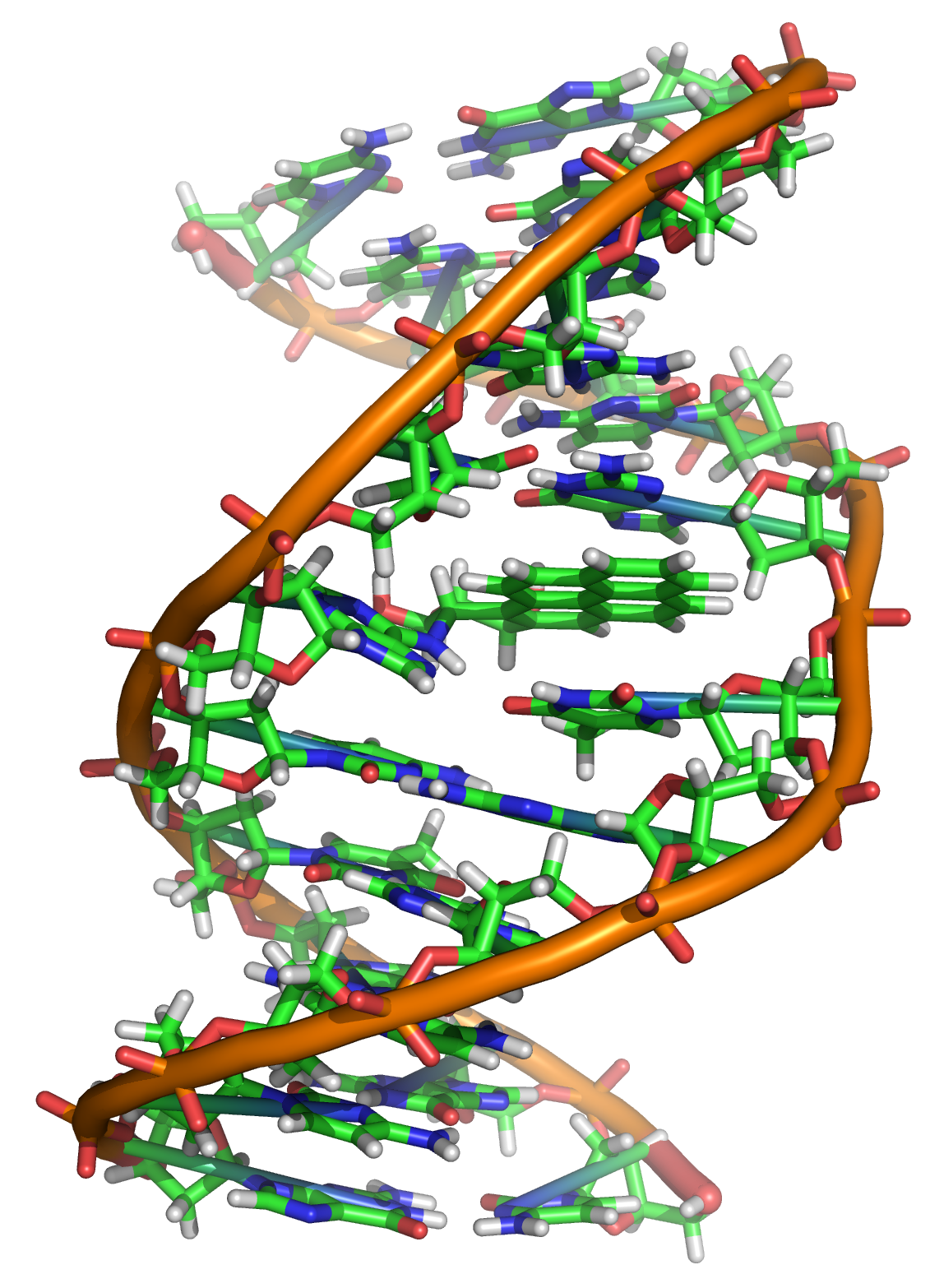
A DNA adduct (at center) of the mutagenic metabolite of benzo[a]pyrene from tobacco smoke

Chemical mutagens either directly or indirectly damage DNA. On this basis, they are of 2 types:

==== Directly acting chemical mutagens ====
They directly damage DNA, but may or may not undergo metabolism to produce promutagens (metabolites that can have higher mutagenic potential than their substrates).

- Reactive oxygen species (ROS) – These may be superoxide, hydroxyl radicals and hydrogen peroxide, and large number of these highly reactive species are generated by normal cellular processes, for example as a by-products of mitochondrial electron transport, or lipid peroxidation. As an example of the latter, 15-hydroperoxyeicosatetraenoic acid, a natural product of cellular cyclooxygenases and lipoxygenases, breaks down to form 4-hydroxy-2(E)-nonenal, 4-hydroperoxy-2(E)-nonenal, 4-oxo-2(E)-nonenal, and cis-4,5-epoxy-2(E)-decanal; these bifunctional electophils are mutagenic in mammalian cells and may contribute to the development and/or progression of human cancers (see 15-Hydroxyicosatetraenoic acid). A number of mutagens may also generate these ROS. These ROS may result in the production of many base adducts, as well as DNA strand breaks and crosslinks.
- Deaminating agents, for example nitrous acid which can cause transition mutations by converting cytosine to uracil.
- Polycyclic aromatic hydrocarbons (PAH), when activated to diol-epoxides can bind to DNA and form adducts.
- Alkylating agents such as ethylnitrosourea. The compounds transfer methyl or ethyl group to bases or the backbone phosphate groups. Guanine when alkylated may be mispaired with thymine. Some may cause DNA crosslinking and breakages. Nitrosamines are an important group of mutagens found in tobacco, and may also be formed in smoked meats and fish via the interaction of amines in food with nitrites added as preservatives. Other alkylating agents include mustard gas and vinyl chloride.
- Aromatic amines and amides have been associated with carcinogenesis since 1895 when German physician Ludwig Rehn observed high incidence of bladder cancer among workers in German synthetic aromatic amine dye industry. 2-Acetylaminofluorene, originally used as a pesticide but may also be found in cooked meat, may cause cancer of the bladder, liver, ear, intestine, thyroid and breast.
- Alkaloid from plants, such as those from Vinca species, may be converted by metabolic processes into the active mutagen or carcinogen.
- Bromine and some compounds that contain bromine in their chemical structure.
- Sodium azide, an azide salt that is a common reagent in organic synthesis and a component in many car airbag systems
- Psoralen combined with ultraviolet radiation causes DNA cross-linking and hence chromosome breakage.
- Benzene, an industrial solvent and precursor in the production of drugs, plastics, synthetic rubber and dyes.
- Chromium trioxide, a highly toxic and oxidizing substance used in electroplating.

==== Indirectly acting chemical mutagens ====
They are not necessarily mutagenic by themselves, but they produce promutagens mutagenic compounds through metabolic processes in cells.

- Polyaromatic hydrocarbons (PAHs)
- Aromatic amines
- Benzene

Some chemical mutagens additionally require UV or visible light activation for their mutagenic effect. These are the photomutagens, which include furocoumarins and limettin.

=== Base analogs ===
- Base analog, which can substitute for DNA bases during replication and cause transition mutations. Some examples are 5-bromouracil and 2-aminopurine.

=== Intercalating agents ===
- Intercalating agents, such as ethidium bromide and proflavine, are molecules that may insert between bases in DNA, causing frameshift mutation during replication. Some such as daunorubicin may block transcription and replication, making them highly toxic to proliferating cells.

=== Metals ===
Many metals, such as arsenic, cadmium, chromium, nickel and their compounds may be mutagenic, but they may act, however, via a number of different mechanisms. Arsenic, chromium, iron, and nickel may be associated with the production of ROS, and some of these may also alter the fidelity of DNA replication. Nickel may also be linked to DNA hypermethylation and histone deacetylation, while some metals such as cobalt, arsenic, nickel and cadmium may also affect DNA repair processes such as DNA mismatch repair, and base and nucleotide excision repair.

=== Biological agents ===
- Transposons, a section of DNA that undergoes autonomous fragment relocation/multiplication. Its insertion into chromosomal DNA disrupts functional elements of the genes.
- Oncoviruses – Virus DNA may be inserted into the genome and disrupts genetic function. Infectious agents have been suggested to cause cancer as early as 1908 by Vilhelm Ellermann and Oluf Bang, and 1911 by Peyton Rous who discovered the Rous sarcoma virus.
- Bacteria – some bacteria such as Helicobacter pylori cause inflammation during which oxidative species are produced, causing DNA damage and reducing efficiency of DNA repair systems, thereby increasing mutation.

== Protection ==
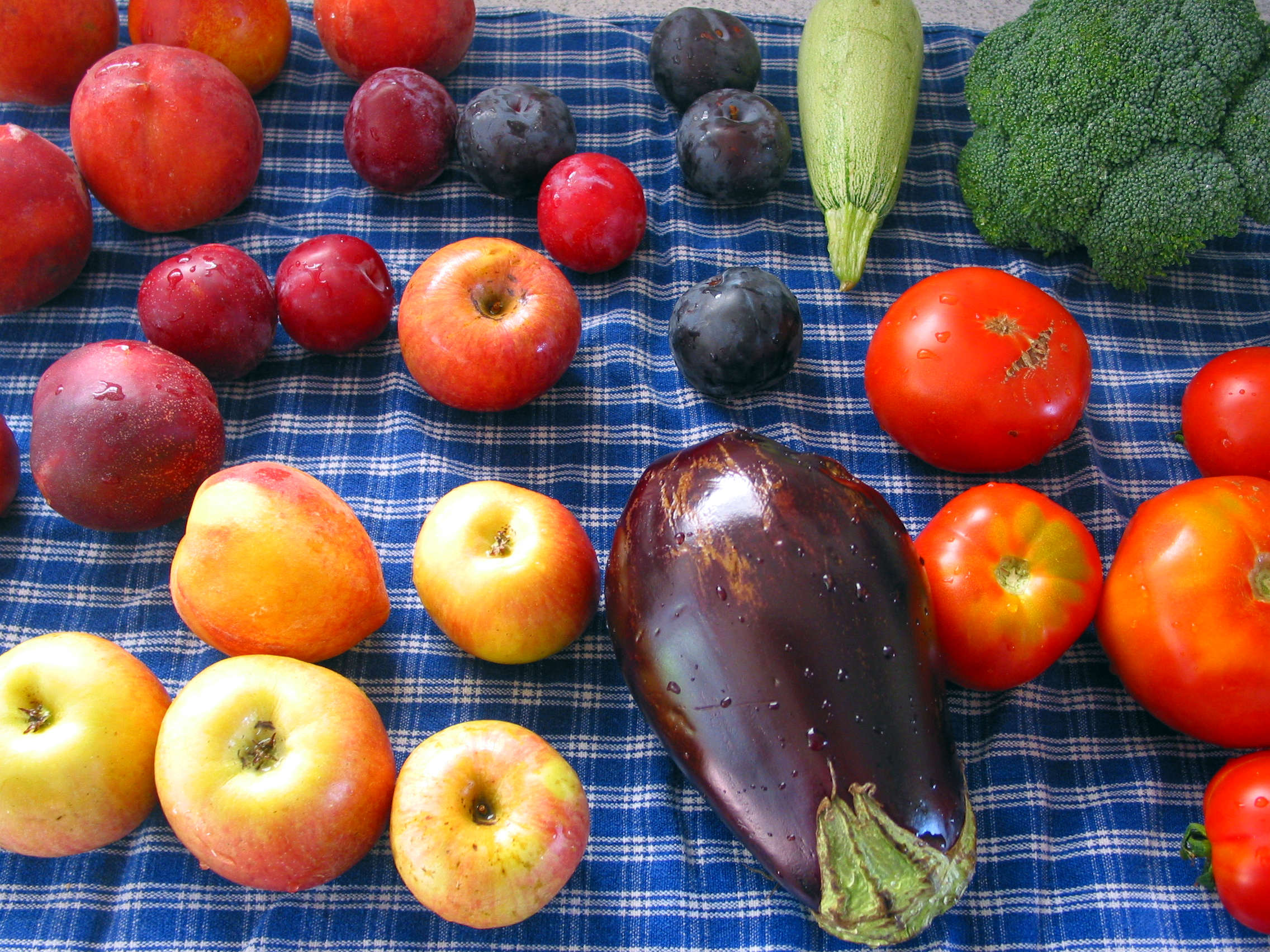
Fruits and vegetables are rich in antioxidants.

Antioxidants are an important group of anticarcinogenic compounds that may help remove ROS or potentially harmful chemicals. These may be found naturally in fruits and vegetables. Examples of antioxidants are vitamin A and its carotenoid precursors, vitamin C, vitamin E, polyphenols, and various other compounds. β-Carotene is the red-orange colored compounds found in vegetables like carrots and tomatoes. Vitamin C may prevent some cancers by inhibiting the formation of mutagenic N-nitroso compounds (nitrosamine). Flavonoids, such as EGCG in green tea, have also been shown to be effective antioxidants and may have anti-cancer properties. Epidemiological studies indicate that a diet rich in fruits and vegetables is associated with lower incidence of some cancers and longer life expectancy, however, the effectiveness of antioxidant supplements in cancer prevention in general is still the subject of some debate.

Other chemicals may reduce mutagenesis or prevent cancer via other mechanisms, although for some the precise mechanism for their protective property may not be certain. Selenium, which is present as a micronutrient in vegetables, is a component of important antioxidant enzymes such as gluthathione peroxidase. Many phytonutrients may counter the effect of mutagens; for example, sulforaphane in vegetables such as broccoli has been shown to be protective against prostate cancer. Others that may be effective against cancer include indole-3-carbinol from cruciferous vegetables and resveratrol from red wine.

An effective precautionary measure an individual can undertake to protect themselves is by limiting exposure to mutagens such as UV radiations and tobacco smoke. In Australia, where people with pale skin are often exposed to strong sunlight, melanoma is the most common cancer diagnosed in people aged 15–44 years.

In 1981, human epidemiological analysis by Richard Doll and Richard Peto indicated that smoking caused 30% of cancers in the US. Diet is also thought to cause a significant number of cancer fatalities, and it has been estimated that around 32% of cancer deaths may be avoidable by modification to the diet. Mutagens identified in food include mycotoxins from food contaminated with fungal growths, such as aflatoxins which may be present in contaminated peanuts and corn; heterocyclic amines generated in meat when cooked at high temperature; PAHs in charred meat and smoked fish, as well as in oils, fats, bread, and cereal; and nitrosamines generated from nitrites used as food preservatives in cured meat such as bacon (ascorbate, which is added to cured meat, however, reduces nitrosamine formation). Excessive alcohol consumption has also been linked to cancer; the possible mechanisms for its carcinogenicity include formation of the possible mutagen acetaldehyde, and the induction of the cytochrome P450 system which is known to produce mutagenic compounds from promutagens.

For certain mutagens, such as dangerous chemicals and radioactive materials, as well as infectious agents known to cause cancer, government legislations and regulatory bodies are necessary for their control.

== Test systems ==
Many different systems for detecting mutagen have been developed. Animal systems may more accurately reflect the metabolism of human, however, they are expensive and time-consuming (may take around three years to complete), they are therefore not used as a first screen for mutagenicity or carcinogenicity.

=== Bacterial ===
- Ames test – This is the most commonly used test, and Salmonella typhimurium strains deficient in histidine biosynthesis are used in this test. The test checks for mutants that can revert to wild-type. It is an easy, inexpensive and convenient initial screen for mutagens.
- Resistance to 8-azaguanine in S. typhimurium – Similar to Ames test, but instead of reverse mutation, it checks for forward mutation that confer resistance to 8-Azaguanine in a histidine revertant strain.
- Escherichia coli systems – Both forward and reverse mutation detection system have been modified for use in E. coli. Tryptophan-deficient mutant is used for the reverse mutation, while galactose utility or resistance to 5-methyltryptophan may be used for forward mutation.
- DNA repair – E. coli and Bacillus subtilis strains deficient in DNA repair may be used to detect mutagens by their effect on the growth of these cells through DNA damage.

=== Yeast ===
Systems similar to Ames test have been developed in yeast. Saccharomyces cerevisiae is generally used. These systems can check for forward and reverse mutations, as well as recombinant events.

=== Drosophila ===
Sex-Linked Recessive Lethal Test – Males from a strain with yellow bodies are used in this test. The gene for the yellow body lies on the X-chromosome. The fruit flies are fed on a diet of test chemical, and progenies are separated by sex. The surviving males are crossed with the females of the same generation, and if no males with yellow bodies are detected in the second generation, it would indicate a lethal mutation on the X-chromosome has occurred.

=== Plant assays ===
Plants such as Zea mays, Arabidopsis thaliana and Tradescantia have been used in various test assays for mutagenicity of chemicals.

=== Cell culture assay ===
Mammalian cell lines such as Chinese hamster V79 cells, Chinese hamster ovary (CHO) cells or mouse lymphoma cells may be used to test for mutagenesis. Such systems include the HPRT assay for resistance to 8-azaguanine or 6-thioguanine, and ouabain-resistance (OUA) assay.

Rat primary hepatocytes may also be used to measure DNA repair following DNA damage. Mutagens may stimulate unscheduled DNA synthesis that results in more stained nuclear material in cells following exposure to mutagens.

=== Chromosome check systems ===
These systems check for large scale changes to the chromosomes and may be used with cell culture or in animal test. The chromosomes are stained and observed for any changes. Sister chromatid exchange is a symmetrical exchange of chromosome material between sister chromatids and may be correlated to the mutagenic or carcinogenic potential of a chemical. In micronucleus Test, cells are examined for micronuclei, which are fragments or chromosomes left behind at anaphase, and is therefore a test for clastogenic agents that cause chromosome breakages. Other tests may check for various chromosomal aberrations such as chromatid and chromosomal gaps and deletions, translocations, and ploidy.

=== Animal test systems ===
Rodents are usually used in animal test. The chemicals under test are usually administered in the food and in the drinking water, but sometimes by dermal application, by gavage, or by inhalation, and carried out over the major part of the life span for rodents. In tests that check for carcinogens, maximum tolerated dosage is first determined, then a range of doses are given to around 50 animals throughout the notional lifespan of the animal of two years. After death the animals are examined for sign of tumours. Differences in metabolism between rat and human however means that human may not respond in exactly the same way to mutagen, and dosages that produce tumours on the animal test may also be unreasonably high for a human, i.e. the equivalent amount required to produce tumours in human may far exceed what a person might encounter in real life.

Mice with recessive mutations for a visible phenotype may also be used to check for mutagens. Females with recessive mutation crossed with wild-type males would yield the same phenotype as the wild-type, and any observable change to the phenotype would indicate that a mutation induced by the mutagen has occurred.

Mice may also be used for dominant lethal assays where early embryonic deaths are monitored. Male mice are treated with chemicals under test, mated with females, and the females are then sacrificed before parturition and early fetal deaths are counted in the uterine horns.

Transgenic mouse assay using a mouse strain infected with a viral shuttle vector is another method for testing mutagens. Animals are first treated with suspected mutagen, the mouse DNA is then isolated and the phage segment recovered and used to infect E. coli. Using similar method as the blue-white screen, the plaque formed with DNA containing mutation are white, while those without are blue.

== In anti-cancer therapy ==
Many mutagens are highly toxic to proliferating cells, and they are often used to destroy cancer cells. Alkylating agents such as cyclophosphamide and cisplatin, as well as intercalating agent such as daunorubicin and doxorubicin may be used in chemotherapy. However, due to their effect on other cells which are also rapidly dividing, they may have side effects such as hair loss and nausea. Research on better targeted therapies may reduce such side-effects. Ionizing radiations are used in radiation therapy.

== In fiction ==
In science fiction, mutagens are often represented as substances that are capable of completely changing the form of the recipient or granting them superpowers; powerful radiations are the agents of mutation for the superheroes in Marvel Comics's Fantastic Four and Hulk, and for Inhumans, the mutagen is called the Terrigen Mist; while in the Ninja Turtles franchise, the mutagen is possessed as an "ooze". Sometimes a mutagen can transform people into horrifying monsters that may threaten humanity, as in the 1973 short story "Gray Matter" by Stephen King. Mutagens are also featured in video games such as Cyberia, System Shock, The Witcher, Metroid Prime: Trilogy, Resistance: Fall of Man, Resident Evil, Infamous, Freedom Force, Command & Conquer, Gears of War 3, StarCraft, BioShock, Fallout, Underrail, and Maneater. In the "nuclear monster" films of the 1950s, nuclear radiation mutates humans and common insects often to enormous size and aggression; these films include Godzilla, Them!, Attack of the 50 Foot Woman, Tarantula!, and The Amazing Colossal Man.

== See also ==
- Carcinogenesis
- DNA damage (naturally occurring)
- Linear no-threshold model
