= Aneugen =

Substances that affect cell division

An aneugen is a substance that causes a daughter cell to have an abnormal number of chromosomes or aneuploidy. A substance's aneugenicity reflects its ability to induce aneuploidy. Unlike clastogens, aneugenic events do not damage the physical structure of the chromosome, but represent a deletion or insertion of an additional copy of a whole chromosome (i.e. with an intact Centromere). Aneugens and clastogens can be differentiated via certain stains, using the technique of Fluorescence in situ hybridization.

Males, if exposed to certain environmental and/or occupational chemical hazards may face an increased risk of spermatozoa aneuploidy. Tobacco smoke contains chemicals that cause DNA damage (see Tobacco smoking#Health). Smoking also can induce aneuploidy. In this study of men with a moderate smoking habit showed an association with increased chromosome 13 disomy in spermatozoa by 3-fold and YY disomy by 2-fold.

Occupational exposure to benzene is associated with a 2.8-fold increase of XX disomy and a 2.6-fold increase of YY disomy in spermatozoa.

Pesticides are released to the environment in large quantities so that most individuals have some degree of exposure. The insecticides fenvalerate and carbaryl have been reported to increase spermatozoa aneuploidy. Occupational exposure of pesticide factory workers to fenvalerate is associated with increased spermatozoa DNA damage. Exposure to fenvalerate raised sex chromosome disomy 1.9-fold and disomy of chromosome 18 by 2.6-fold (Xia et al., 2004). Exposure of male workers to carbaryl increased DNA fragmentation in spermatozoa, and also increased sex chromosome disomy by 1.7-fold and chromosome 18 disomy by 2.2-fold.

Humans are exposed to perfluorinated compounds (PFCs) in many commercial products. Men contaminated with PFCs in whole blood or seminal plasma have spermatozoa with increased levels of DNA fragmentation and chromosomal aneuploidies.

== See also ==
- Chromosome segregation
- Clastogen
- Non-disjunction
