= Micronucleus =

Small nucleus in the cells of some organisms

Micronuclei visible in boxes

A micronucleus is a small nucleus. In most species, it is an abnormal product that forms whenever a chromosome or a fragment of a chromosome is not incorporated into one of the daughter nuclei during cell division. It usually is a sign of genotoxic events and chromosomal instability. Micronuclei are commonly seen in cancerous cells and may indicate genomic damage events that can increase the risk of developmental or degenerative diseases.

Micronuclei form during anaphase from lagging acentric chromosomes or chromatid fragments caused by incorrectly repaired or unrepaired DNA breaks or by nondisjunction of chromosomes. This improper segregation of chromosomes may result from hypomethylation of repeat sequences present in pericentromeric DNA, irregularities in kinetochore proteins or their assembly, a dysfunctional spindle apparatus, or flawed anaphase checkpoint genes. Micronuclei can contribute to genome instability by promoting a catastrophic mutational event called chromothripsis. Many micronucleus assays have been developed to test for the presence of these structures and determine their frequency in cells exposed to certain chemicals or subjected to stressful conditions.

The term micronucleus may also refer to the smaller nucleus in ciliate protozoans, such as the Paramecium. In mitosis it divides by fission, and in conjugation a pair of gamete micronuclei undergo reciprocal fusion to form a zygote nucleus, which gives rise to the macronuclei and micronuclei of the individuals of the next cycle of fission. In other words, they act as separate storage for germline DNA.

== Discovery ==
Micronuclei in newly formed red blood cells in humans are known as Howell-Jolly bodies because these structures were first identified and described in erythrocytes by hematologists William Howell and Justin Jolly. These structures were later found to be associated with deficiencies in vitamins such as folate and B12. The relationship between formation of micronuclei and exposure to environmental factors was first reported in root tip cells exposed to ionizing radiation. Micronucleus induction by a chemical was first reported in Ehrlich ascites tumor cells treated with colchicine.

== Formation ==
Micronuclei primarily result from acentric chromosome fragments or lagging whole chromosomes that are not included in the daughter nuclei produced by mitosis because they fail to correctly attach to the spindle during the segregation of chromosomes in anaphase. These full chromosomes or chromatid fragments are eventually enclosed by a nuclear membranes and are structurally similar to conventional nuclei, albeit smaller in size. This small nucleus is referred to as a micronucleus. The formation of micronuclei can only be observed in cells undergoing nuclear division and can be clearly seen using cytochalasin B to block cytokinesis to produce a binucleated cells.

Acentric chromosome fragments may arise in a variety of ways. One way is that disrepair of DNA double-strand breaks can lead to symmetrical or asymmetrical chromatid and chromosome exchanges as well as chromatid and chromosome fragments. If DNA damage exceeds the repair capacity of the cell, unrepaired double-stranded DNA breaks may also result in acentric chromosome fragments. Another way eccentric chromosome fragments may arise is when defects in genes related to homologous recombinational repair (ex: ATM, BRCA1, BRCA2, and RAD51) result in a dysfunctional error-free homologous recombinational DNA repair pathway and causes the cell to resort to the error-prone non-homologous end-joining (NHEJ) repair pathway, increasing the likelihood of incorrect repair of DNA breaks, formation of dicentric chromosomes, and acentric chromosome fragments. If enzymes in the NHEJ repair pathway are defective as well, DNA breaks may not be repaired at all. Additionally, simultaneous excision repair of damaged or inappropriate bases incorporated in DNA that are in proximity and on opposite complementary DNA strands may lead to DNA double-stranded breaks and micronucleus formation, especially if the gap-filling step of the repair pathway is not completed.

Micronuclei can also form from fragmented chromosomes when nucleoplasmic bridges (NPB) are formed, stretched, and broken during telophase.

Micronuclei formation may also result from chromosome malsegregation during anaphase. Hypomethylation of cytosine in centromeric and pericentromeric areas and higher-order repeats of satellite DNA in centromeric DNA can result in such chromosomal loss events. Classical satellite DNA is normally heavily methylated at cytosine residues but may become almost fully unmethylated due to ICF syndrome (Immunodeficiency, centromere instability, and facial anomalies syndrome) or after treatment by DNA methyl transferase inhibitors. Since assembly of kinetochore proteins at centromeres is affected by the methylation of cytosine and histone proteins, a reduction in heterochromatin integrity as a result of hypomethylation can interfere with microtubule attachment to chromosomes and with the sensing of tension from correct microtubule-kinetochore connections. Other possible causes of chromosome loss that could lead to micronuclei formation are defects in kinetochore and microtubule interactions, defects in mitotic spindle assembly, mitosis check point defects, abnormal centrosome amplification, and telomeric end fusions that result in dicentric chromosomes that detach from the spindle during anaphase. Micronuclei originating from chromosome loss events and acentric chromosome fragments can be distinguished using pancentromeric DNA probes.

== Identification ==
The number of micronuclei per cell can be predicted using the following formula:
$MN/cell = AF/cell * F$
AF is the number of acentric fragments and F = 0.5 - 0.5P, where P equals the probability of fragments being included in the traditional nucleus and not forming a micronucleus.

One study, which used Giemsa stain to stain nuclear material, established the following criteria for identifying micronuclei:
1) diameter less than 1/3 of the primary nucleus,
2) non-retractility (excludes small stain particles),
3) color the same as or lighter than the main nucleus (excludes large stain particles),
4) location within 3 or 4 nuclear diameters of the main nucleus without touching it, and
5) no more than two associated with one primary nucleus (3 or more micronuclei are likely polymorphs or prorubicytes with nuclear fragments).

== Assays ==
The micronucleus tests provide important information about a chemical's ability to interfere with chromosome structure and function. For instance, many known human carcinogens test positive in mammalian micronucleus tests. In these tests, organisms are treated with a chemical and the resulting frequency of micronucleated cells is measured. If there is a marked increase in the number of cells with micronuclei, it can be concluded that the chemical induces structural and/or numerical chromosomal damage. Since micronucleus tests must be performed on actively dividing cells, bone marrow stem cells and the erythrocytes they produce through cell divisions are ideal candidates. These cells experience constant, rapid turnover and the lack of a true nucleus in erythrocytes makes micronuclei easily visible under a microscope.

Micronucleus assay systems are very economical, require much less skill in scoring that conventional metaphase tests, and are much faster than these conventional tests. Since micronucleus assays reflect chromosomal aberrations reliably and rapidly, they are extremely useful for a quick assessment of chromosomal damage. In particular, the CBMNcyt (cytokinesis-block micronucleus cytome) assay is extremely versatile and is one of the preferred methods to measure the level of chromosomal damage and chromosomal instability in cells. The cytokinesis-block micronucleus (CBMN) assay was first developed to score micronuclei in cells that completed nuclear division by blocking them at the binucleate stage before cytokinesis. It later evolved into the CBMN 'cytome' assay to further explore cell death, cytostasis, and biomarkers of DNA damage. The major drawback of using micronucleus tests is that they cannot determine different types of chromosomal aberrations and can be influenced by the mitotic rate and proportion of cell death, skewing the results.

== Patterns in formation ==
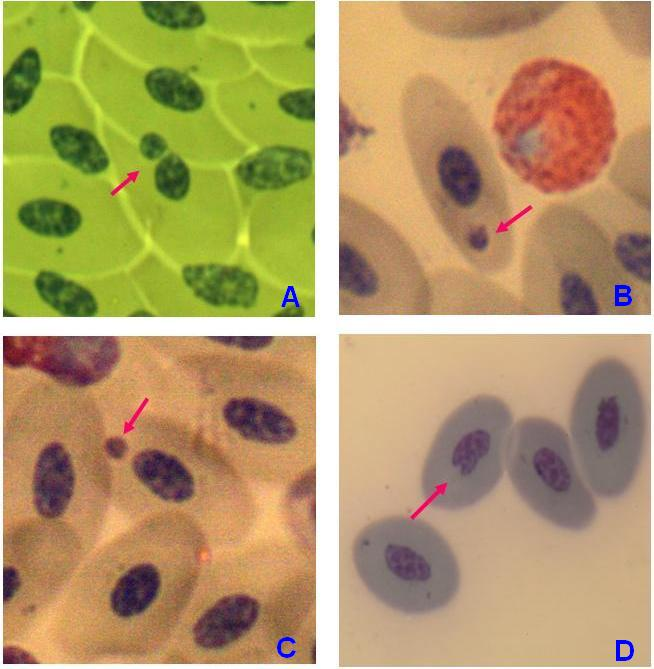
B, C. Micronuclei in peripheral blood erythrocytes of penguins Pygoscelis papua.

Multiple studies have found that micronuclei frequency in women is higher than in men and that the number of micronuclei increase until around 70 years of age. Micronuclei levels ranged from 0.5 to 1.4% in men to 0.9 to 1.8% in women. Gender-related differences were mainly seen in younger age groups (<= 50 years) with an almost two-fold difference between men and women. The patterns in the number of micronuclei after 70 years of age is controversial. Some studies have shown that in individuals over 70 years of age, micronucleus frequency increases in both sexes. On the other hand, other studies have found that in the oldest age groups, micronuclei frequencies level off. The deficiency of micronuclei in some of the oldest age groups may be explained by the fact that micro nucleated cells are preferentially eliminated by apoptosis. However, higher micronuclei frequency corresponds to a decreased efficiency of DNA repair and increased genomic instability, which are typical in older subjects. Age-related increases in micronuclei frequency also correspond well with age-related increases in the hypoploidy and the age-related increase in sex chromosome loss. Alternatively, the leveling off of frequency of micronuclei in older subjects would suggest a threshold of genomic instability that cannot be crossed if the person is to survive. If this were the case, women appear to reach this threshold faster than men.

Sex chromosomes contribute to the majority of chromosome loss events with increasing age. In females, the X chromosome can account for up to 72% of the observed micronuclei of which 37% appear to be lacking a functional kinetochore assembly possibly due to X chromosome inactivation. Multiple studies have shown that the frequencies of autosome-positive micronuclei in both genders and of sex chromosome-positive MN in men were similar and remained unchanged in older groups while the frequency of X-positive MN in women was higher than the average frequency of autosome-positive MN and continued to increase until the oldest age.

The frequencies of chromosomal aberrations, damaged cells, and micronuclei are significantly higher in smokers than non-smokers.

In normal people and many other mammals, which do not have nuclei in their red blood cells, the micronuclei are removed rapidly by the spleen. Hence high frequencies of micronuclei in human peripheral blood indicate a ruptured or absent spleen. In mice, these are not removed, which is the basis for the in vivo micronucleus test.

== See also ==
- Macronucleus
- Cancerous micronuclei
- Microchromosome
