= Phleomycin =

Group of chemical compounds

Chemical structure of phleomycin D1

Phleomycins are a group of glycopeptide antibiotics found in Streptomyces which are closely related to bleomycin.

Examples include:

- Phleomycin C
- Phleomycin D1 (zeocin)
- Phleomycin D2
- Phleomycin E
