= Howell–Jolly body =

Cluster of DNA in red blood cells

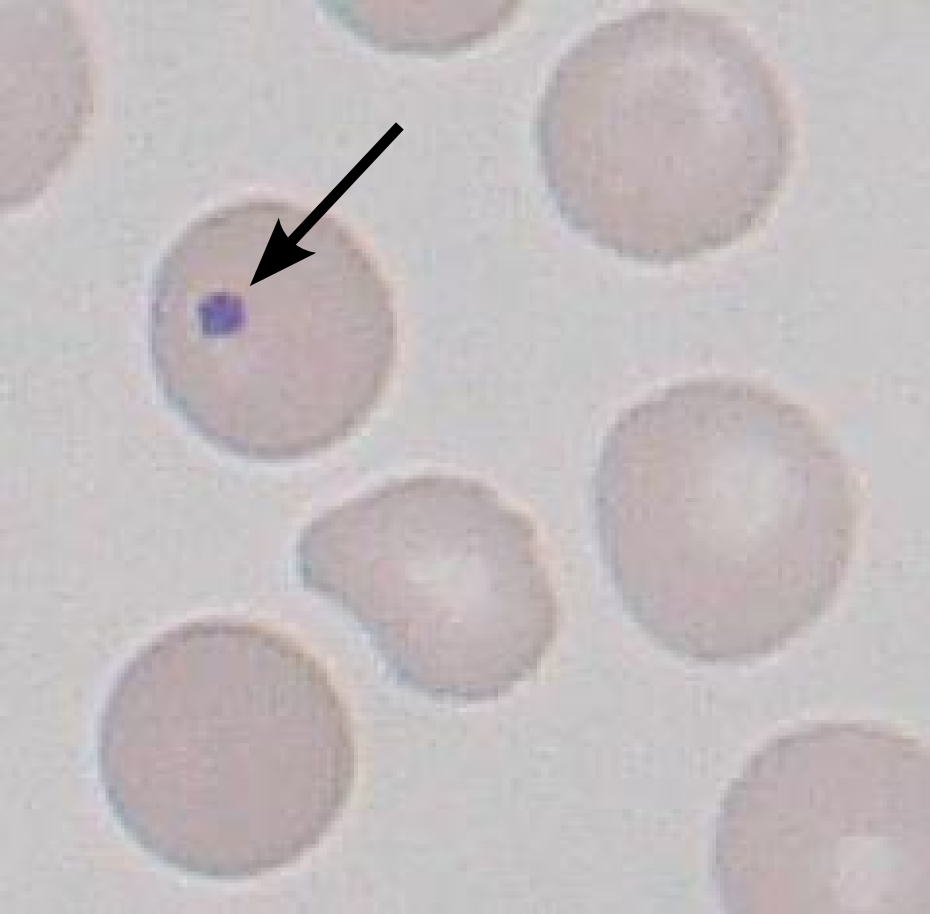
A Howell–Jolly body (marked by arrow) within an erythrocyte

A Howell–Jolly body is a cytopathological finding of basophilic nuclear remnants (clusters of DNA) in circulating erythrocytes. During maturation in the bone marrow, late erythroblasts normally expel their nuclei; but, in some cases, a small portion of DNA remains. The presence of Howell–Jolly bodies usually signifies a damaged or absent spleen, because a healthy spleen would normally filter such erythrocytes.

The Howell–Jolly body is named after William Henry Howell and Justin Marie Jolly.

== Appearance ==
Howell–Jolly bodies: small, round inclusions seen in erythrocytes (peripheral blood – MGG stain)

This DNA appears as a basophilic (purple) spot on the otherwise eosinophilic (pink) erythrocyte on a standard H&E stained blood smear. These inclusions are normally removed by the spleen during erythrocyte circulation, but will persist in individuals with functional hyposplenia or asplenia.

== Causes ==
Howell–Jolly bodies are seen with markedly decreased splenic function. Common causes include asplenia (post-splenectomy) or congenital absence of spleen (right atrial appendage isomerism). Spleens are also removed for therapeutic purposes in conditions like hereditary spherocytosis, trauma to the spleen, and autosplenectomy caused by sickle cell anemia. Other causes are radiation therapy involving the spleen, such as that used to treat Hodgkin lymphoma.

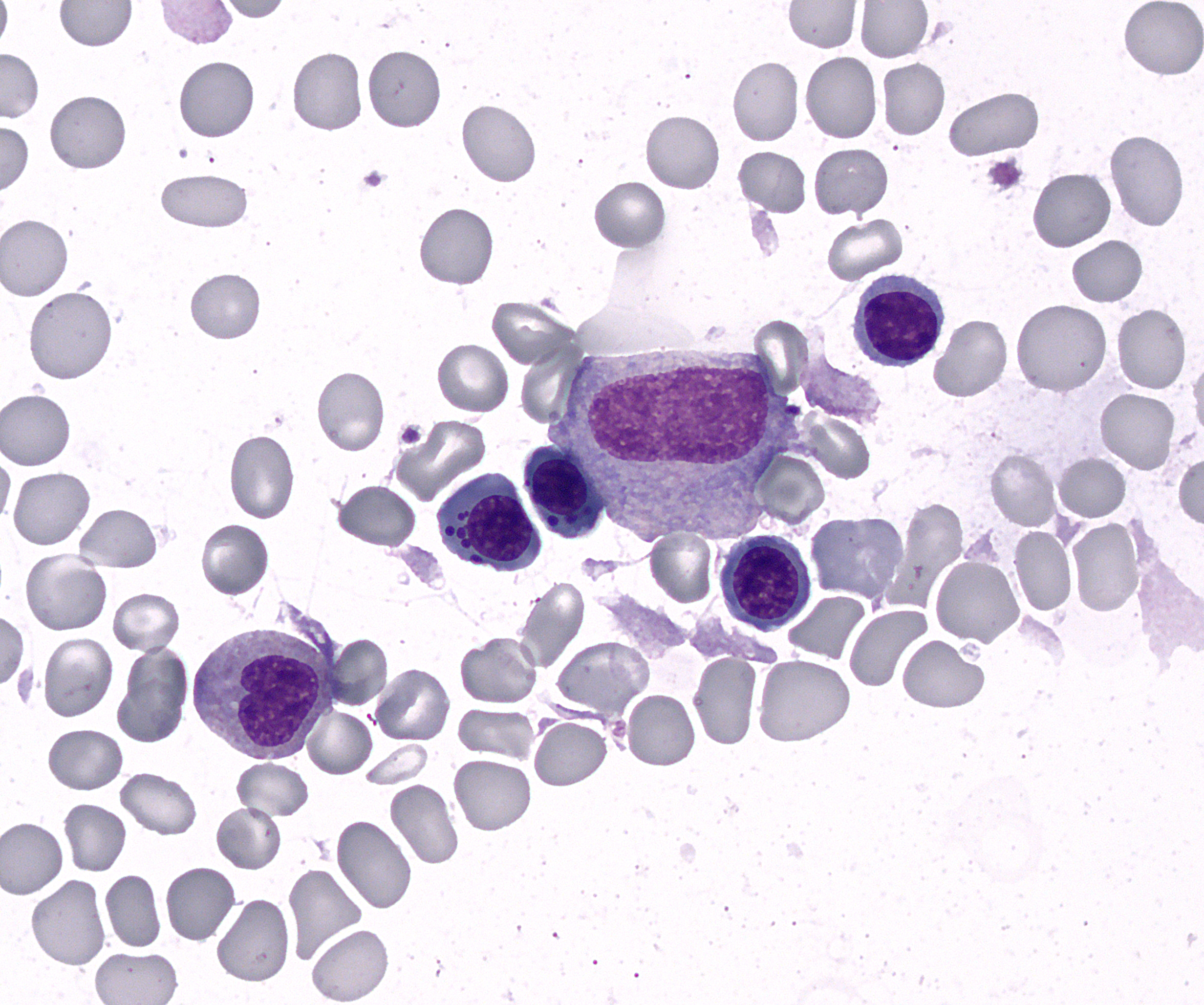
Howell–Jolly bodies inside of two normoblasts (center) in bone marrow. Giemsa stain, 1000x.

Howell–Jolly bodies are also seen in amyloidosis, severe hemolytic anemia, megaloblastic anemia, hereditary spherocytosis, and myelodysplastic syndrome (MDS). The bodies can also be seen in premature infants.
