= William Henry Howell =

American physiologist (1860–1945)

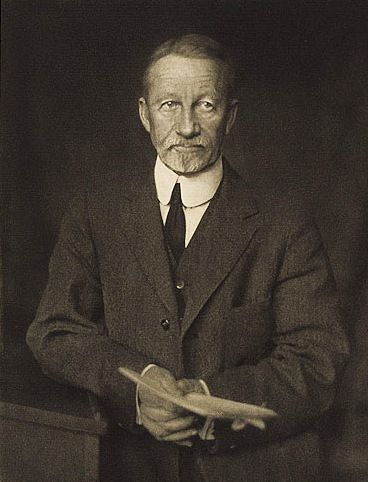
- Born: February 20, 1860; Baltimore, Maryland, U.S.
- Died: February 6, 1945 (aged 84); Baltimore, Maryland, U.S.
- Resting place: Druid Ridge Cemetery
- Education: Trinity College; University of Edinburgh
- Alma mater: Baltimore City College; Johns Hopkins University (BA, PhD); University of Michigan Medical School (MD)
- Spouse: Anne Janet Tucker (died)
- Children: 3

Signature
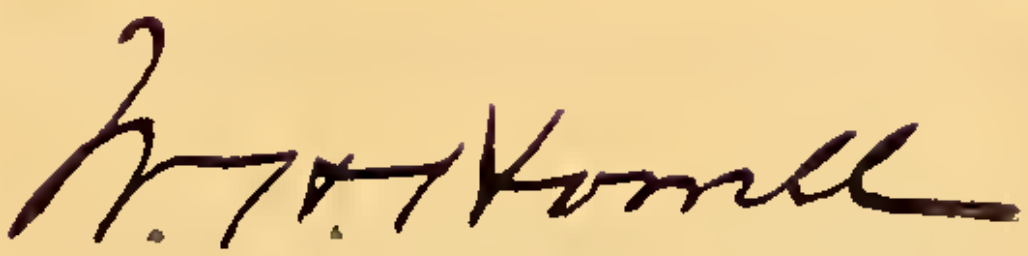

William Henry Howell (February 20, 1860 – February 6, 1945) was an American physiologist. He pioneered the use of heparin as a blood anti-coagulant.

== Early life ==
William Henry Howell was born on February 20, 1860, in Baltimore, Maryland. He graduated from the Baltimore City College high school in 1878. He was educated at Johns Hopkins University, from which he graduated in 1881 with a Bachelor of Arts. He taught at the University of Michigan and at Harvard before becoming professor at Johns Hopkins in 1893. He received a Doctor of Medicine from the University of Michigan in 1890. He graduated with a PhD from Johns Hopkins in 1894. He also studied at Trinity College and the University of Edinburgh.

== Career ==
Howell served as associate professor of physiology at Johns Hopkins in 1888 and 1889. He served as a full professor at the University of Michigan from 1889 to 1892. He then served as associate professor of physiology at Harvard Medical School from 1892 to 1893. He then moved back to Johns Hopkins and remained there for the rest of his life. Howell was dean of the medical school from 1899 to 1911. He resigned that position to help William Henry Welch and others to establish the first graduate school of public health in the United States, the Johns Hopkins School of Hygiene and Public Health. He was Dean of the School of Hygiene (now Bloomberg School of Public Health) from 1926 to 1931.

Howell was elected to the American Philosophical Society in 1903, the United States National Academy of Sciences in 1905, and the American Academy of Arts and Sciences in 1921.

Howell served as chairman of the National Research Council from 1932 to 1933.

Howell contributed to the London Journal of Physiology, the Transactions of the Royal Society, the Johns Hopkins Biological Studies, the Journal of Morphology, and the Journal of Experimental Medicine. He was associate editor of the American Journal of Physiology after 1898. He wrote Text-Book of Physiology (1905; fifth edition, 1913). And this was a standard text book for medical students for the next 50 years.

== Personal life ==
Howell married Anne Janet Tucker. She predeceased Howell. They had two daughters and one son, Janet H., Mrs. Edward O. Hulburt and Roger.

Howell died from a heart attack on February 6, 1945, at his home at 112 St. Dunstan's Road in Baltimore. He was buried at Druid Ridge Cemetery.

== See also ==
- Howell-Jolly body
- Heparin, and the Howell Unit
