= Splenic infarction =

Interruption to the spleen's blood supply

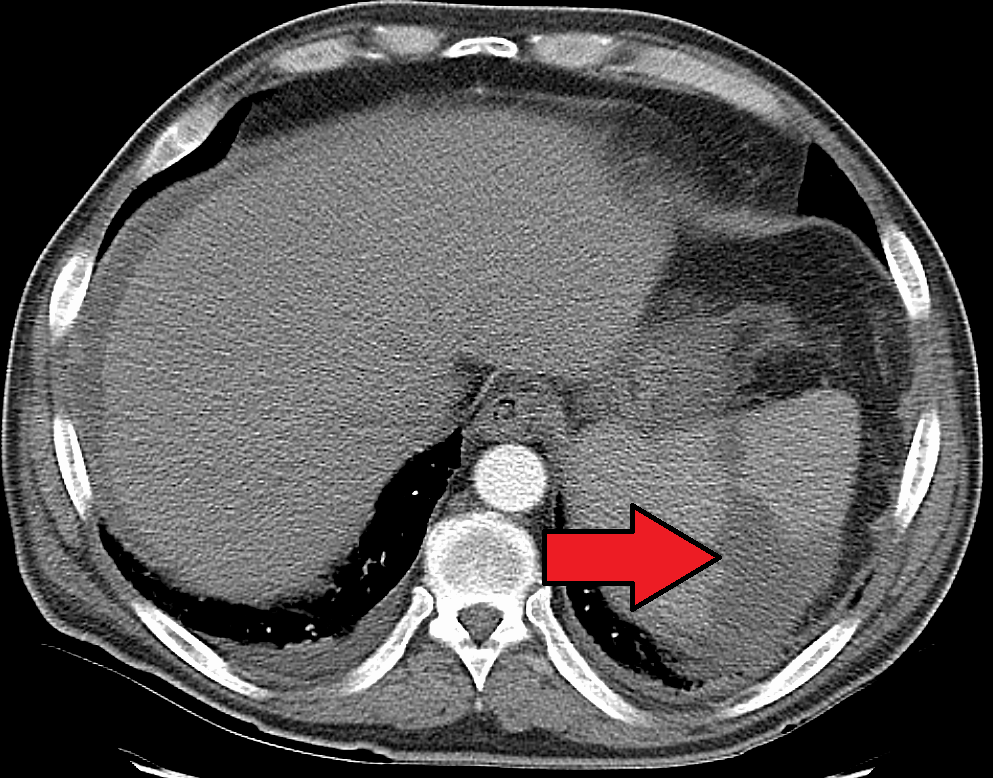
- Splenic infarct seen on CT
- Specialty: General surgery

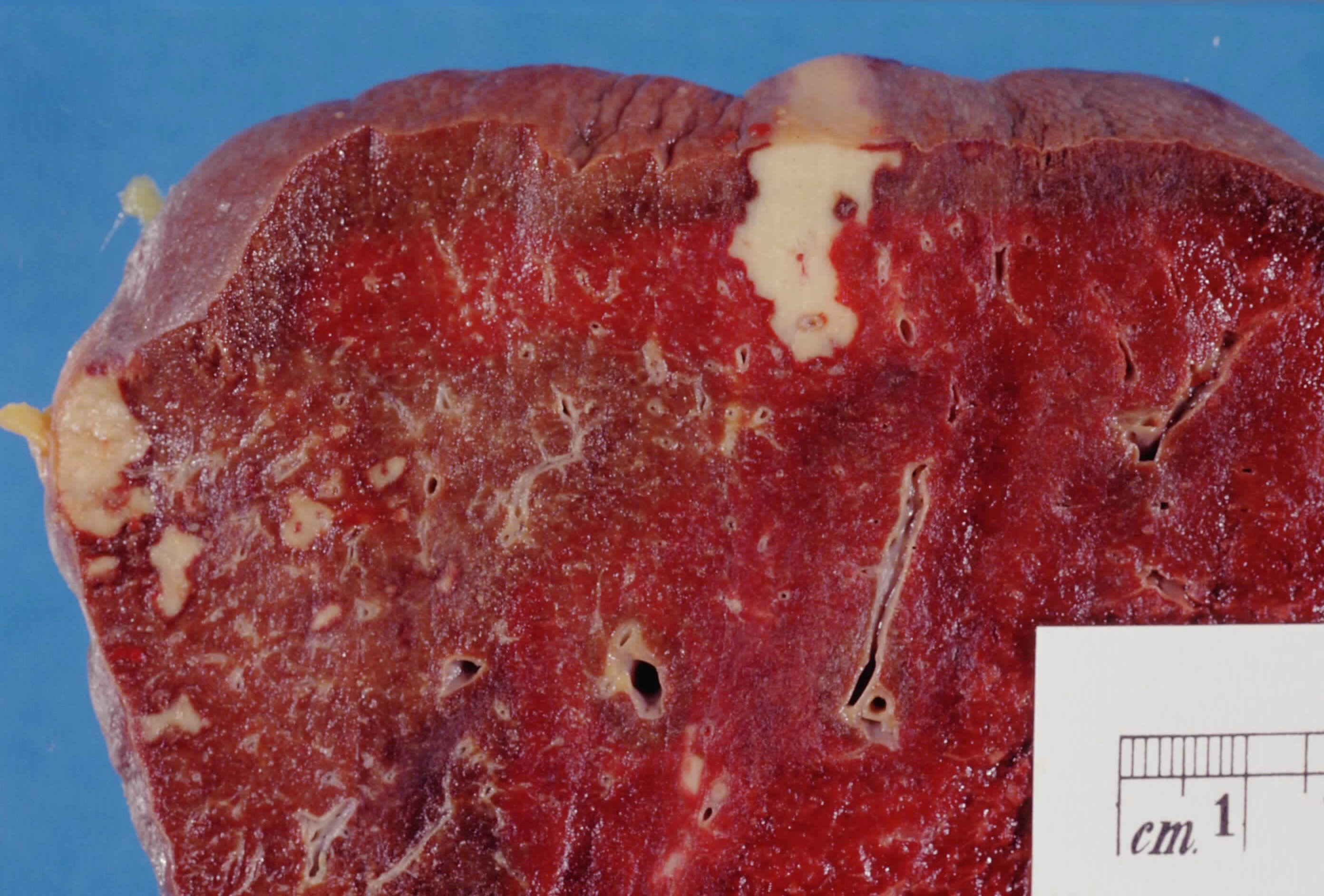
Healed splenic infarcts, the largest is the pale area, upper surface

Splenic infarction is a condition in which blood flow supply to the spleen is compromised, leading to partial or complete infarction (tissue death due to oxygen shortage) in the organ. Splenic infarction occurs when the splenic artery or one of its branches are occluded, for example by a blood clot.

In one series of 59 patients, mortality amounted to 5%. Complications include a ruptured spleen, bleeding, an abscess of the spleen (for example, if the underlying cause is infective endocarditis) or pseudocyst formation. Splenectomy may be warranted for persistent pseudocysts due to the high risk of subsequent rupture.

== Diagnosis ==
Although it can occur asymptomatically, the typical symptom is severe pain in the left upper quadrant of the abdomen, sometimes radiating to the left shoulder. Fever and chills develop in some cases. It has to be differentiated from other causes of acute abdomen.

An abdominal CT scan is the most commonly used modality to confirm the diagnosis, although abdominal ultrasound can also contribute.

== Treatment ==
There is no specific treatment, except treating the underlying disorder and providing adequate pain relief. Surgical removal of the spleen (splenectomy) is only required if complications ensue; surgical removal predisposes to overwhelming post-splenectomy infections.

== Causes ==
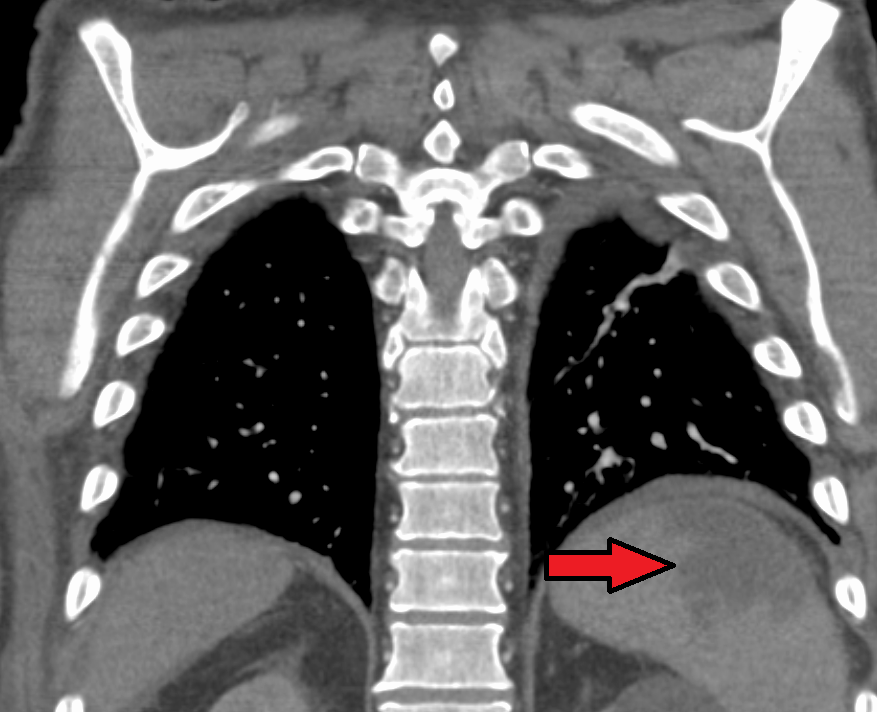
Splenic infarct seen on CT

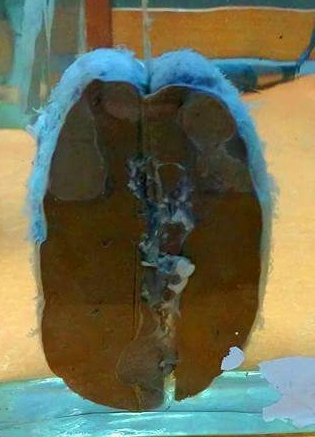
Healed splenic infarct

Several factors may increase the tendency for clot formation, such as specific infections (such as infectious mononucleosis, cytomegalovirus infection, malaria, or babesiosis), inherited clotting disorders (thrombophilia, such as Factor V Leiden, antiphospholipid syndrome), malignancy (such as pancreatic cancer) or metastasis, or a combination of these factors.

In some conditions, blood clots form in one part of the circulatory system and then dislodge and travel to another part of the body, which could include the spleen. These emboligenic disorders include atrial fibrillation, patent foramen ovale, endocarditis or cholesterol embolism.

Splenic infarction is also more common in hematological disorders with associated splenomegaly, such as the myeloproliferative disorders. Other causes of splenomegaly (for example, Gaucher disease or hemoglobinopathies) can also predispose to infarction. Splenic infarction can also result from a sickle cell crisis in patients with sickle cell anemia. Both splenomegaly and a tendency towards clot formation feature in this condition. In sickle cell disease, repeated splenic infarctions lead to a non-functional spleen (autosplenectomy).

Any factor that directly compromises the splenic artery can cause infarction. Examples include abdominal traumas, aortic dissection, torsion of the splenic artery (for example, in wandering spleen) or external compression on the artery by a tumor. It can also be a complication of vascular procedures.

Splenic infarction can be due to vasculitis or disseminated intravascular coagulation. Various other conditions have been associated with splenic infarction in case reports, for example granulomatosis with polyangiitis or treatment with medications that predispose to vasospasm or blood clot formation, such as vasoconstrictors used to treat esophageal varices, sumatriptan or bevacizumab.

In a single-center retrospective cases review, people who were admitted to the hospital with a confirmed diagnosis of acute splenic infarction, cardiogenic emboli was the dominant etiology followed by atrial fibrillation, autoimmune disease, associated infection, and hematological malignancy. In spite of those already had risk factors of developing splenic infarction, there were nine beforehand healthy people. And among them, 5 of 9 hitherto silent antiphospholipid syndrome or mitral valve disease had been identified. Two remained cryptogenic.

=== Therapeutic infarction ===
Splenic infarction can be induced for the treatment of such conditions as portal hypertension or splenic injury. It can also be used prior to splenectomy for the prevention of blood loss.
