= Kehr =

Kehr is a German topographic surname. It may refer to:

- Dave Kehr (born 1953), American film critic
- Diego Paulsen Kehr (born 1987), Chilean politician
- Ernest Anthony Kehr (1911–1986), American philatelist
- Eckart Kehr, (1902–1933), German historian
- Edward C. Kehr (1837–1918), American politician and lawyer
- Günter Kehr (1920–1989), German violinist and teacher
- Hans Kehr, Johannes Otto Kehr, (1862–1916), German surgeon and professor
- Paul Fridolin Kehr, (1860–1944), German historian (see Paul Fridolin Kehr)
- Rick Kehr, Karl Richard Kehr, American football player, b. 1959

== See also ==
- Kehr's sign
- Kerr (disambiguation)
