= Spleen pain =

Human pain from the area of the spleen

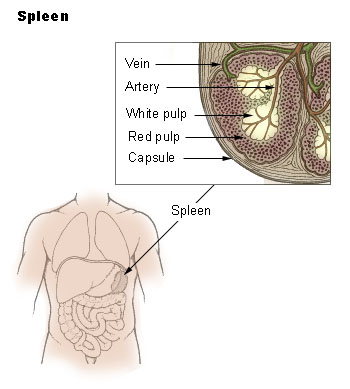
The human spleen is located in the upper left abdomen, behind the stomach

Spleen pain is a pain felt from the left upper quadrant of the abdomen or epigastrium where the human spleen is located or neighboring.

== Etiology ==
=== Splenomegaly ===
Splenomegaly can result in hematologic disturbances and abdominal pain and can increase the risk for splenic rupture, which also causes spleen pain, from blunt trauma, resulting in life-threatening internal bleeding. Many conditions can cause splenomegaly, such as various infections, liver disease, and cancer.

=== Splenic infarction ===
Abdominal pain remains the leading chief complaint in patients diagnosed with a splenic infarct. Evaluation of patients who present with abdominal pain requires a broad differential approach.

Lab evaluation may help rule in other causes of abdominal pain. Elevated liver function tests, bilirubin or lipase, may suggest a hepatobiliary or pancreatic source for pain. Leukocytosis and elevated lactate dehydrogenase (LDH) may be found in splenic infarction. However, these results lack specificity to splenic infarct.

Radiographic testing is required to detect this rare illness. In the hyperacute phase of infarction, abdominal CT scan performed with intravenous contrast is the imaging modality of choice in suspected splenic infarction. Splenic infarct appears as a wedge-shaped area of splenic tissue with the apex pointed toward the hilum and the base of the splenic capsule. As the infarction matures, the affected tissue may normalize, liquefy or become contracted or scarred. Abdominal ultrasound has also been used to detect splenic infarction. Ultrasound findings of the hypoechoic wedge-shaped region of splenic tissue indicate infarction. Evolution of infarction may appear as hyperechoic with retraction of the splenic capsule.

=== Splenic abscess ===
Fever is the most common symptom of splenic abscess, followed by abdominal pain and a tender mass on palpation of the left upper quadrant of the abdomen. The common signs and symptoms described of a splenic abscess include the triad of fever, left upper quadrant tenderness, and leukocytosis is present only in one-third of the cases.

=== Splenic rupture ===
Trauma is the most common mechanism of splenic rupture, and blunt trauma involving the left-upper quadrant, left rib cage, or left flank should raise suspicion for splenic involvement. The absence of substantial trauma cannot exclude the possibility of splenic injury, as individuals with a history of splenomegaly require less force for traumatic rupture.

Severally ill patients may present with hypovolemic shock manifesting as tachycardia, hypotension, and pallor. Other findings include tenderness to palpation in the left upper quadrant, generalized peritonitis, or referred pain to the left shoulder (Kehr sign). Kehr sign is a rare finding and should increase the suspicion of the peritoneal process and possible splenic rupture. Some patients also report pleuritic left-sided chest pain in the setting of a ruptured spleen. Caution should be used early in the evaluation of patients with a concerning mechanism of injury, since few symptoms may be present early in the course of splenic rupture.

It is important to ask focused questions regarding previous surgical history, hepatic disease process, recent infections, anticoagulant, aspirin or nonsteroidal anti-inflammatory drugs usage and bleeding disorders. Visual inspection for signs of external trauma such as abrasions, lacerations, contusions, and classic seatbelt sign on the abdomen is helpful. The absence of external visual findings does not exclude intra-abdominal pathology, as up to 20% of patients with intra-abdominal injury may not display these findings upon initial examination. Also, examination on arrival may not reveal severe tenderness, rigidity, or abdominal distention in spite of rupture. Physical examination may also be limited in a patient with altered mental status or distracting injuries. Therefore, the physical exam alone is not always sensitive when evaluating a patient with a splenic rupture.
