= Capnocytophaga canimorsus =

- Gram stain showing the rod-shaped Gram-negative bacteria.

Scientific classification
- Domain: Bacteria
- Kingdom: Pseudomonadati
- Phylum: Bacteroidota
- Class: Flavobacteriia
- Order: Flavobacteriales
- Family: Flavobacteriaceae
- Genus: Capnocytophaga
- Species: C. canimorsus

Binomial name
- Capnocytophaga canimorsus Brenner et al. 1989

Capnocytophaga canimorsus is a fastidious, slow-growing, rod-shaped Gram-negative bacterium in the genus Capnocytophaga. It is a commensal bacterium in the oral microbiota of dogs and cats. It can infect people after a bite or scratch, or when animal saliva enters an open wound. Infection is uncommon, but it can progress rapidly to sepsis and other severe complications. The risk of severe illness is higher in people with asplenia, heavy alcohol use, or certain immunocompromising conditions. The pathogenesis of C. canimorsus is not fully understood, but studies have identified mechanisms that may contribute to its ability to cause disease. Recent contact with dogs or cats can be an important clue in diagnosis because the bacterium grows slowly and can be difficult to identify. Infection is treated with antibiotics.

== Morphology, growth, and culture ==
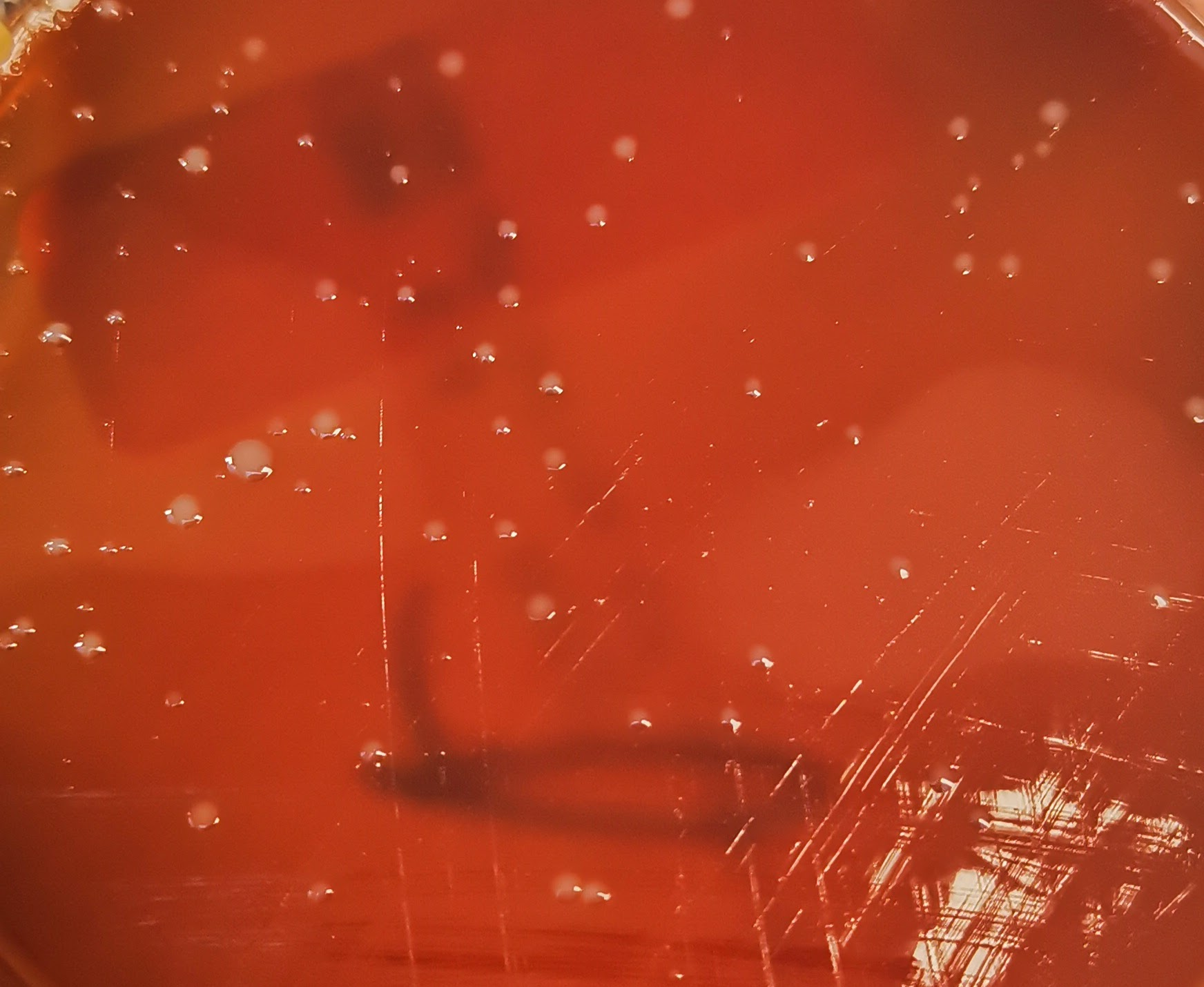
C. canimorsus on blood agar

C. canimorsus is a fastidious, Gram-negative, fermentative, encapsulated, non-spore-forming rod. Bacilli are usually 1-3 μm in length. After growth on agar plates, longer rods tend to have a curved shape. The bacterium lacks flagella and moves with a gliding motion, which can be difficult to observe. It grows on enriched media such as blood agar plates (heart infusion agar with 5% sheep or rabbit blood) and chocolate agar plates. Growth is slow, so colonies may be difficult to see before 48 hours. After 18 hours, colonies are usually less than 0.5 mm in diameter, and are spotty and convex. After 24 hours, they may reach 1 mm in diameter. By 48 hours, colonies are narrow, flat, and smooth, with spreading edges. During this time, they may appear white-grey or grey and translucent, with a slight yellow tint when scraped from the agar.

== Genome ==
The genome of C. canimorsus contains a singular circular chromosome, with sizes of the genome varying per organism. Usually the genus Capnocytophaga has a sequenced genome range from 2.4 to 3.4 Mb, which normally contains around 2,150-3,150 genes. Across these gene regions, a G+C content ranges from 33.5% to 44%. The C. canimorsus is one of the smallest known strains in this genus, with a genome range of around 2.41 Mb containing 2,136 genes. In addition, the C. canimorsus species normally contains three to four sets of the rRNA genes 5S, 16S, and 23S.

The genome of C. canimorsus strain Cc5 was one of the first animal-associated genomes in the Capnocytophaga genus to be sequenced. This has allowed for many subsequent sequencing efforts to be produced, allowing for a better understanding of the Capnocytophaga species. A major example of this was in 2025, when the complete genome of the KM3195_24 strain was isolated and sequenced out of the oral cavity of a red fox (Vulpes vulpes). The circular genome strain consisted of around 2,718,701 base pairs, a G+C content of around 36%, three rRNA operons, and 2,419 coding sequences.

Isolating these genetic sequences has also led to genomic analyses to identify antimicrobial-resistance genes in some of these species isolates. A 2026 study used hybrid Illumina and Nanopore genome sequencing, and through this found a specific class D gene in both canines and humans. The blaOXA-347 gene is naturally found within the bacterium's chromosome and is not known to be associated with genetic elements that allow it to spread between bacteria. Additional resistance genes, including aadS, aac(6')-D292, erm(F), estT, tet(X2) and tet(X4), were also identified in these isolates however they are not identified in the specific Cc5 reference strain that was used as a control in this experiment.

== Animal hosts and infections ==
Members of the genus Capnocytophaga are found in the oral cavities of humans and animals. Some species are associated with humans, but C. canimorsus is found mainly in dogs and cats and is not a member of the normal human microbiota. About 26% of dogs carry C. canimorsus in their mouths. The bacterium rarely causes disease in animals. One case involved C. canimorsus isolated from an infected bite wound on the head of a small dog that had been bitten by another dog; the bacteria remained localized to the wound, and the dog did not present with bacteremia. A separate case involved a rabbit bitten on the head by a dog. In experimental infections in rabbits, C. canimorsus caused a range of symptoms, including disseminated intravascular coagulation, cellular necrosis (tissue death), low blood pressure, gangrene, and kidney failure.

== Epidemiology ==
Significant dog bites affect tens of millions of people globally each year, and cases of human infection following exposure to C. canimorsus have been observed worldwide. It is estimated that 2% of the U.S. population, 4.5–4.7 million people, are bitten by dogs each year. Cases have been reported in the United States, Canada, Europe, Australia and South Africa. Symptoms may appear within 2–3 days after exposure, or up to 4 weeks later. Middle-aged and elderly persons are at greater risk for contraction of the disease; more than 60% of sufferers are 50 years of age or older. In addition, individuals who spend a greater portion of their time with dogs and cats are also at higher risk. This includes veterinarians, breeders, pet owners, and keepers. Having certain pre-existing medical conditions exacerbates the risk. Chance of infection by any bacterial species after dog bites varies between 3 and 20%; for cats, it may be as high as 50%. A review of reported zoonotic Capnocytophaga bloodstream infections found that C. canimorsus was responsible for 93.1% of cases in the study. The patients had a median age of 60 years, and males accounted for 61.8% of the cases. Other health conditions were common which affected 80.4% of patients, while almost one-third were immunosuppressed (asplenia or alcohol use disorders)

== Evasion of the immune system ==
In a study using J774.1 mouse macrophages, C. canimorsus survived and multiplied in the culture but was not internalized. The macrophages remained attached and viable, with no cytotoxicity observed. Across 10 different C. canimorsus strains, macrophages released negligible amounts of TNF-α and IL-1α. Experiments with live and heat-killed Cc5 also found no detectable IL-8, IL-6, interferon-γ, and nitric oxide. The study found that toll-like receptor 4 (TLR4) did not respond to Cc5. Additionally, Cc5 lowered TLR4 expression. These results suggest that C. canimorsus can reduce some inflammatory responses in macrophages.

Other studies found that the tested C. canimorsus strains could resist complement-mediated killing, and that strain Cc5 resisted phagocytosis and killing by human polymorphonuclear leukocytes (PMNs). Although the complement C3b was deposited on Cc5, very little membrane attack complex (MAC) formed on its surface. A mutant with an altered surface polysaccharide was more susceptible to complement and PMN killings, suggesting that the polysaccharide structure contributes to the bacterium's resistance.

== High-risk categories ==
Several host factors are associated with severe C. canimorsus infection. Commonly reported factors include asplenia, alcohol use disorder, and immunosuppression. Smoking and β-thalassemia major have also been reported as risk factors.

=== Asplenia ===
Overwhelming post-splenectomy infection can be caused by encapsulated bacteria, including C. canimorsus. A review of more than 100 reported human cases found that 33% involved individuals who had undergone splenectomy. The spleen helps remove encapsulated bacteria from the bloodstream, so asplenia weakens one of the body's defenses against C. canimorsus. Asplenia is associated with decreased IgM and IgG production, delayed macrophage mobilization, and lower levels of tuftsin, which helps stimulate phagocytosis. These changes make it harder for the immune system to recognize and remove bacteria and for macrophages to engulf them.

People with asplenia have a much higher risk of severe, potentially fatal C. canimorsus infection. Estimates suggest their risk of death is 30-60 times greater than that of people without asplenia. Individuals with asplenia often experience symptom onset within a day of exposure. In severe cases, the infection can progress to organ failure or death within 24-72 hours after symptoms begin. The mortality rate in individuals with asplenia is much higher than in any other at-risk category for C. canimorsus infections.

=== Alcohol use disorder ===
Alcohol use disorder was reported in 24% of more than 100 published cases of C. canimorsus infection. Alcohol use has been associated with decreased superoxide production and neutrophil elastase activity. These changes may weaken the body's antibacterial defenses. Alcohol abuse has been associated with increased iron absorption and higher levels of iron in the blood. The resulting iron availability has been proposed as a factor that may support C. canimorsus growth.

=== Immunosuppression ===
Immunosuppression is an important, yet heterogeneous risk factor regarding C. canimorsus infections. Current studies report that suppressed immune system function and comorbidity represent a significant minority, including those suffering from malignancy, splenectomy, cirrhosis, alcohol use disorder, diabetes mellitus, and those who are taking any immunosuppressive medications. One study found that roughly 45% of patients with Capnocytophaga infections had at least one condition associated with impaired immune function. Severe zoonotic infections often present as sepsis or bacteremia in these patients. In addition, severe exposure does not have to occur through bites and can happen through any contact with or resulting in broken skin, such as scratches, licking, or close contact with dogs or cats. However, immunosuppression is not necessarily a requirement for C. canimorsus to infect someone. In fact, one study reported that most people with severe infection were immunocompetent.

== Symptom onset and clinical manifestations ==
Symptoms of C. canimorsus infection usually begin 3-5 days after exposure, although reported onset ranges from 1–8 days. Early symptoms can be mild and nonspecific, leading to difficulties in identifying the infection. Initial symptoms vary depending on whether the infection remains localized or spreads systemically. Local symptoms at the site of a bite or scratch may include redness, swelling, pain, blisters, cellulitis, or pus. When the infection spreads beyond the site of exposure, it may cause symptoms resembling an influenza-like illness. Reported symptoms include fever, chills, vomiting, fatigue, diarrhea, malaise, abdominal pain, myalgia, headaches, and skin rashes such as exanthema. Neurological symptoms, including confusion and altered mental status, may develop as the infection progresses. Respiratory symptoms such as dyspnea may also occur.

If C. canimorsus enters the bloodstream, the infection may progress rapidly, causing bacteremia and fulminant sepsis, which can be fatal. Severe infections may also result in septic shock, multi-organ failure, endocarditis, disseminated intravascular coagulation, or meningitis. In an experimental study, methylprednisolone prolonged bacteremia and increased the development of endocarditis in rabbits infected with the bacterium. The relevance of this finding to human infections remains uncertain.

== Diagnosis ==
Diagnosing C. canimorsus can be difficult because it grows slowly and may be difficult to identify in culture. A history of recent contact with a dog or cat can help clinicians consider the infection. Blood cultures are commonly used, but identification can take several days or fail. Biochemical tests can support identification. C. canimorsus typically tests positive for catalase and oxidase, arginine dihydrolase, maltose, and lactose. It typically tests negative for nitrate reduction, urease, and H_{2}S production. It does not ferment inulin or sucrose, which can help distinguish it from closely related species. If the culture or biochemical testing does not identify the species, methods such as PCR and 16S rRNA gene sequencing can help identify it.

In some cases of meningitis, a Gram stain of cerebrospinal fluid may reveal bacteria, but further testing may be needed to identify the species. In severe sepsis or septic shock, a peripheral blood smear may reveal bacteria, providing an early clue to the infection.

== Treatment ==
After a dog or cat bite, prompt wound irrigation and washing of the wound with soap and water for 15 minutes is recommended. Preventive antibiotics may be advised for high-risk wounds or people with weakened immune systems. Treatment of Capnocytophaga infection depends on its severity and the patient's clinical presentation. Severe infections are initially treated with a beta-lactam-beta-lactamase inhibitor combination, such as piperacillin-tazobactam, or a carbapenem, such as imipenem. Severe infections may require hospitalization. Non-severe infections may be treated with oral amoxicillin-clavulanate or clindamycin. Some clinical isolates carry beta-lactamase genes, which can affect their susceptibility to beta-lactam antibiotics. Treatment can be adjusted based on susceptibility results. Penicillin G and ampicillin have also been used to treat C. canimorsus. It has also shown susceptibility to third-generation cephalosporins, tetracyclines, clindamycin, and chloramphenicol, although gentamicin resistance has been reported.

== History ==
Capnocytophaga canimorsus was first observed in 1976 by Raymond Bobo and Eleanor Newton. The pair isolated a previously unknown Gram-negative bacterium from a patient presenting with meningitis in addition to sepsis. The patient had been previously exposed to two dog bites on two consecutive days from two different dogs. Noting the coincidence between the timing of the bites and the onset of symptoms, Butler et al. analyzed 17 similar cases of patients presenting with either sepsis or meningitis from 1961 to 1975. The cases had been sent to the CDC for examination due to the presence of an unknown Gram-negative bacillus isolated from infected individuals. Butler notified the CDC of the high incidence of dog bites in connection with the infections. The CDC could not identify the organism, so they applied the name CDC group DF-2. DF-2 stands for dysgonic fermenter, meaning that the bacterium is a slow-growing, fermentative bacillus. In 1989, while analyzing the properties of the unknown bacterium, Weaver et al. noted many similarities to bacteria of the genus Capnocytophaga. Later that same year, Brenner et al. proposed the name Capnocytophaga canimorsus after examining the morphology, G+C% content, and motility of the species.

=== Etymology ===
The name Capnocytophaga is derived from the Greek word kapnos, meaning "smoke", and given here because of its dependence on carbon dioxide for growth. It was added to distinguish this genus from the Cytophaga genus, originating from the Greek words of kytos (meaning "cell"), and phagein (meaning "eat"). The species name of canimorsus comes from the Latin words canis and morsus, meaning "dog" and "bite" respectively.
