= Asplenia =

Lack of spleen or its function

- Specialty: Medical genetics

Asplenia is the absence of normal spleen function and is associated with some serious infection risks. Hyposplenism is the condition of reduced ('hypo-'), but not absent, splenic functioning.

Functional asplenia occurs when splenic tissue is present but does not work well (e.g., sickle-cell disease, polysplenia) – such patients are managed as if asplenic – while in anatomic asplenia, the spleen itself is absent.

== Causes ==
=== Congenital ===
- Congenital asplenia is rare. There are two distinct types of genetic disorders: heterotaxy syndrome and isolated congenital asplenia.
- polysplenia

=== Acquired ===
Acquired asplenia occurs for several reasons:

- Following splenectomy due to splenic rupture from trauma or because of tumor
- After splenectomy with the goal of interfering with splenic function, as a treatment for diseases (e.g., idiopathic thrombocytopenic purpura, thalassemia, spherocytosis), in which the spleen's usual activity exacerbates the disease
- After splenectomy with the goal of arresting the progression of cancers (Chronic lymphocytic leukemia, Hodgkin's disease (starting in the 1970s), non-Hodgkin lymphoma)
- Due to underlying diseases that destroy the spleen (autosplenectomy), e.g. sickle-cell disease.
- Celiac disease: unknown physiopathology. In a 1970 study, it was the second most common cause of abnormalities of red blood cells linked to hyposplenism, after surgical splenectomy.

== Functional asplenia ==
Functional asplenia can occur when patients with metabolic or haematological disorders have their splenic tissue organisation altered. This can lead to results similar to those seen in patients who have undergone a splenectomy e.g. becoming infected with encapsulated bacteria such as Haemophilus influenzae, Streptococcus pneumoniae and Neisseria meningitidis. Patients who have some form of asplenia have an increased susceptibility to these encapsulated bacterial infections mainly because they lack IgM memory B cells and their non-adherence to polysaccharide vaccines. Furthermore, there is a deficiency of other splenic cells e.g. splenic macrophages. This combined with the lack of B cells can provide an environment favourable for the development of bacterial infections.

== Partial splenectomy and preservation of splenic function ==
In an effort to preserve some of the spleen's protective roles, attempts are now often made to preserve a small part of the spleen when performing either surgical subtotal (partial) splenectomy, or partial splenic embolization. This may be particularly important in poorer countries where protective measures for patients with asplenia are not available. However, it has been advised that preoperative vaccination is advisable until the remnant splenic tissue can reestablish its function.

== Risks ==
Asplenia is a form of immunodeficiency, increasing the risk of sepsis from polysaccharide encapsulated bacteria, and can result in overwhelming post splenectomy infection (OPSI), often fatal within a few hours. In particular, patients are at risk from Streptococcus pneumoniae, Haemophilus influenzae, and meningococcus. The risk is elevated as much as 350–fold.

The increased risk of infection is due to the inability to clear opsonised bacteria from circulating blood. There is also a deficiency of T-cell independent antibodies, such as those reactive to the polysaccharide capsule of Streptococcus pneumoniae.

The risk to asplenic patients has been expressed as equivalent to an adult dying in a road traffic accident (1 to 5 percent of people without spleens would develop a severe infection per decade) (reference UK Splenectomy Trust Advice)—hence sensible precautions are advisable. Increased platelet counts can be seen in individuals without a functioning spleen.

== Diagnosis ==
Diagnosis is confirmed by abdominal ultrasonography and detection of Howell-Jolly bodies in red blood cells.

== Management ==
To minimise the risks associated with splenectomy, antibiotic and vaccination protocols have been established, but are often poorly adhered to by physicians and patients due to the complications resulting from antibiotic prophylaxis such as development of an overpopulation of Clostridioides difficile in the intestinal tract.

=== Antibiotic prophylaxis ===
Because of the increased risk of infection, physicians administer oral antibiotics as prophylaxis after a surgical splenectomy, or starting at birth for congenital or functional asplenia.

Those with asplenia are also cautioned to start a full-dose course of antibiotics at the first onset of an upper or lower respiratory tract infection (for example, sore throat or cough), or at the onset of any fever. Even with a course of antibiotics and even with a history of relevant vaccination, persons without a functional spleen are at risk for overwhelming post-splenectomy infection.

In an emergency room or hospital setting, appropriate evaluation and treatment for an asplenic febrile patient should include a complete blood count with differential, blood culture with Gram stain, arterial blood gas analysis, chest x-ray, and consideration for lumbar puncture with CSF studies. None of these evaluations should delay the initiation of appropriate broad-spectrum intravenous antibiotics. The Surviving Sepsis Campaign guidelines state that antibiotics should be administered to a patient suspected of sepsis within 1 hour of presentation. A delay in starting antibiotics for any reason is associated with a poor outcome.

=== Vaccinations ===
It is suggested that splenectomized persons receive the following vaccinations, and ideally before planned splenectomy surgery:

- Pneumococcal polysaccharide vaccine (not before 2 years of age). Children may first need one or more boosters of pneumococcal conjugate vaccine if they did not complete the full childhood series.
- Haemophilus influenzae type b vaccine, especially if not received in childhood. For adults who have not been previously vaccinated, two doses given two months apart was advised in the new 2006 UK vaccination guidelines (in the UK may be given as a combined Hib/MenC vaccine).
- Meningococcal conjugate vaccine, especially if not received in adolescence. Previously vaccinated adults require a single booster, and non-immunised adults are advised, in the UK, since 2006, to have two doses given two months apart. Children too young for the conjugate vaccine should receive meningococcal polysaccharide vaccine in the interim.
- Influenza vaccine, every winter, to help prevent getting secondary bacterial infection.

=== Travel measures ===
In addition to the normal immunizations advised for the countries to be visited, Group A meningococcus should be included if visiting countries of particular risk (e.g. sub-saharan Africa). The non-conjugated Meningitis A and C vaccines usually used for this purpose give only 3 years coverage and provide less-effective long-term cover for Meningitis C than the conjugated form already mentioned.

Those lacking a functional spleen are at higher risk of contracting malaria, and succumbing to its effects. Travel to malarial areas carries greater risks and is best avoided. Travellers should take the most appropriate anti-malarial prophylaxis medication and be extra vigilant over measures to prevent mosquito bites.

The pneumococcal vaccines may not cover some other strains of Pneumococcal bacteria present in other countries. Likewise, their antibiotic resistance may vary, requiring a different standby antibiotic.

=== Additional measures ===
- Surgical and dental procedures - Antibiotic prophylaxis may be required before certain surgical or dental procedures.
- Animal bites - adequate antibiotic cover is required after even minor dog or other animal bites. Asplenic patients are particularly susceptible to infection by Capnocytophaga canimorsus and should receive a five-day course of amoxicillin/clavulanate (erythromycin in patients allergic to penicillin).
- Tick bites - Babesiosis is a rare tickborne infection. Patients should check themselves or have themselves inspected for tick bites if they are in an at-risk situation. Presentation with fever, fatigue, and haemolytic anaemia requires diagnostic confirmation by identifying the parasites within red blood cells on blood film and by specific serology. Quinine (with or without clindamycin) is usually an effective treatment.
- Alert warning - People without a working spleen can carry a card, or wear a special bracelet or necklace which says that they do not have a working spleen. This would alert a healthcare professional to take rapid action if they become seriously ill and cannot notify them of their condition.
