= Lépine's sign =

- Differential diagnosis: gallbladder disease

Lépine's sign is one of the medical signs of gallbladder disease. It is positive when effleurage (light percussion) with crooked third finger at the point of the gallbladder projection to anterior abdominal wall (Gallbladder point, which is present below right costal margin in mid clavicular line) elicits pain. It is not to be confused with the following:

- Kehr's sign which is referred pain to left shoulder due to ruptured spleen or blood or irritant in peritoneal cavity.
- Murphy's sign which is tested for during an abdominal examination; it is performed by asking the patient to breathe out and then gently placing the hand below the costal margin on the right side at the mid-clavicular line (the approximate location of the gallbladder). The patient is then instructed to inspire (breathe in). Normally, during inspiration, the abdominal contents are pushed downward as the diaphragm moves down (and lungs expand). If the patient stops breathing in (as the gallbladder is tender and, in moving downward, comes in contact with the examiner's fingers) and winces with a 'catch' in breath, the test is considered positive. In order for the test to be considered negative, the same maneuver must not elicit pain when performed on the left side)

Not to confuse with Lasègue's sign, a sign of elongation.
