= Robert Hugh Martin =

British soldier

Robert Hugh Martin (1896 – 14 March 1918) was a British soldier who is perhaps the only known soldier to receive heart surgery during World War I.

On 14 November 1917 Trooper Martin was wounded in the Salonika Campaign when he was shot by a Bulgarian soldier. On 13 January 1918 he was transferred to St. Elmo Hospital in Valletta, Malta, where he underwent complex heart surgery in early 1918, led by the pioneering British surgeon Charles Alfred Ballance. However, Martin died of post-operative sepsis on 14 March 1918 and was buried on Malta.
