= Charles Alfred Ballance =

English surgeon

Sir Charles Ballance
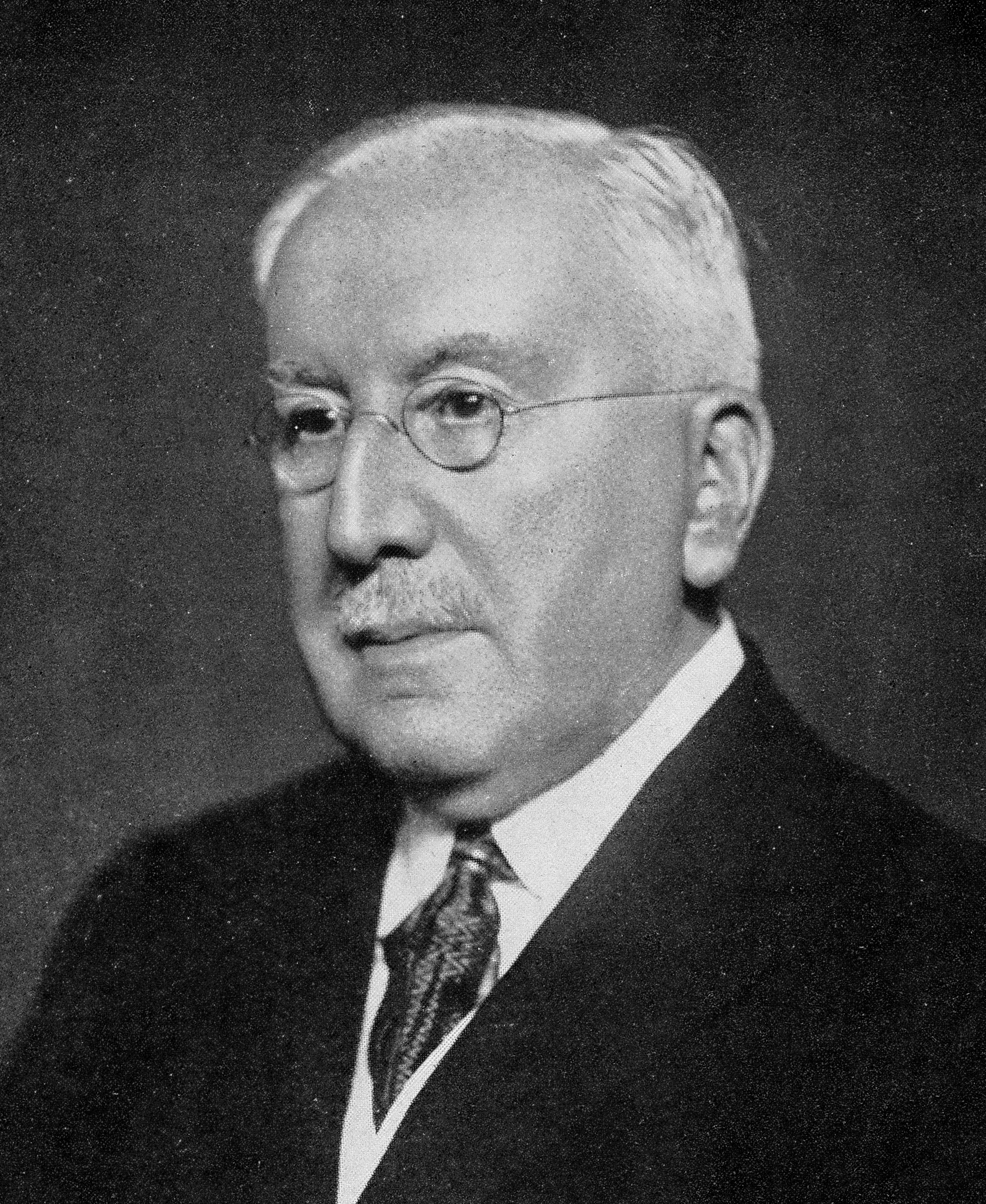
- Born: 30 August 1856; Clapton, Middlesex, England
- Died: 9 February 1936 (aged 79); London, England
- Known for: otology
- Awards: Lister Medal (1933)
- Scientific career
- Fields: surgery

Sir Charles Alfred Ballance KCMG CB MVO FRCS (30 August 1856 – 9 February 1936) was an English surgeon who specialized in the fields of otology and neurotology.

== Biography ==
Charles Alfred Ballance was the eldest son of Charles and Caroline Ballance (née Pollard). His three brothers all entered the medical profession, the youngest of whom, Sir Hamilton Ashley Ballance, was also a distinguished surgeon. Charles studied at St Thomas' Hospital in London, where he passed his finals in 1881 and became a Master of Surgery the following year. He was appointed Aural Surgeon there in 1888, becoming assistant surgeon in 1891, surgeon in 1900 and consulting surgeon in 1919.

For much of his professional life he was associated with St Thomas's and National Hospital, Queen Square in London, where he was appointed consulting surgeon in 1908, and was also made Chief Surgeon of the Metropolitan Police in 1912. During the First World War he worked in Malta, organising and supervising military hospitals with Charles Symonds, for which he was awarded a knighthood of the Order of St John of Jerusalem. In 1918 he carried out an early cardiac operation to remove a bullet from the heart of Robert Hugh Martin, a wounded soldier, who unfortunately later died from sepsis. In 1919 he delivered the Bradshaw Lecture to the Royal College of Surgeons entitled The Surgery of the Heart.

He was President of the Medical Society of London in 1906 and became the first president of the Society of British Neurological Surgeons in 1927. He was a colleague of famed surgeon Victor Horsley (1857–1916).

Ballance is remembered for his pioneer work involving nerve grafting and neurologic surgery. He is credited as being the first physician to perform a facial nerve to spinal accessory nerve anastomosis for treatment of facial palsy. He also did the first operation for complete removal of a cerebellopontine angle tumor, as well as being one of the first surgeons to perform a radical mastoidectomy with ligation of the jugular vein. Ballance is also remembered for successfully sectioning the vestibulocochlear nerve (cranial nerve VIII) as a remedy for intractable vertigo.

Ballance published over 75 articles during his career, his best known work being the 1919 "Essays on the Surgery of the Temporal bone". Later in life, he was knighted as "Sir Charles Alfred Ballance" for his many contributions made in medicine.

In 1933, he was awarded the Lister Medal, and gave the associated Lister Memorial Lecture. The lecture was titled 'On Nerve Surgery'. It was published in 1933, dedicated "To the Memory of A.C.B.", his son Alaric Charles Ballance, MB who had died in February of that year. The book includes details of Ballance's work at three laboratories: the National Institute for Medical Research in Hampstead, the laboratories of the Royal College of Surgeons of England, and the 'Laurelwood Laboratory' in the USA. The latter was a laboratory established at Laurelwood, the country residence of Arthur Baldwin Duel, near Pawling, New York.

He died in 1936 and was cremated at Golders Green crematorium. He had married in 1883 Sophia Annie Smart, the daughter of Alfred Smart of The Priory, Blackheath, with whom he had five daughters and a son.

== Honours ==
Ballance became a Member of the Royal College of Surgeons in 1879 and a Fellow in 1882. He was named a Member of the Royal Victorian Order in 1906, a Companion of the Order of the Bath in 1916 and invested as a Knight Commander of the Order of St Michael and St George in 1918.

== Associated eponym ==
- Ballance's sign: Fixed dullness in the left flank, and shifting dullness in the right flank while the patient is lying on his left side. Associated with rupture of the spleen in abdominal trauma.

== Bibliography ==
- The Carl Ferdinand Von Graefe Institute for the History of Plastic Surgery and Related Specialties
- Neurosurgical Focus by Robert H. Wilkins, M.D.
- Van de Graaf, Robert C; IJpma, Frank F A; Nicolai, Jean-Philippe A (January 2009). "Sir Charles Alfred Ballance (1856–1936) and the introduction of facial nerve crossover anastomosis in 1895" (PDF). Journal of Plastic, Reconstructive & Aesthetic Surgery. 62 (1): 43–9. doi:10.1016/j.bjps.2008.06.052. PMID 18922751.
- Waldman, Erik H; Lustig Lawrence R (September 2005). "Sir Charles Alfred Ballance: contributions to otology and neurotology". Otol. Neurotol. 26 (5): 1073–82. doi:10.1097/01.mao.0000176176.79517.8b. PMID 16151361. S2CID 33087.
- Stone, J L (March 1999). "Sir Charles Ballance: pioneer British neurological surgeon". Neurosurgery. 44 (3): 610–31, discussion 631–2. doi:10.1097/00006123-199903000-00100. PMID 10069599.
- Horwitz, N H (1998). "Charles S. Sherrington (1857–1952): historical perspective". Neurosurgery. 43 (6): 1496–7. doi:10.1097/00006123-199812000-00155. PMID 9848871.

Police appointments
Preceded by Clinton Thomas Dent	Chief Surgeon of the Metropolitan Police; 1912-1926	Succeeded by Maurice Cassidy
