= Capnocytophaga =

Scientific classification
- Domain: Bacteria
- Kingdom: Pseudomonadati
- Phylum: Bacteroidota
- Class: Flavobacteriia
- Order: Flavobacteriales
- Family: Flavobacteriaceae
- Genus: Capnocytophaga; Brenner et al. 1990

Species
- C. canimorsus C. cynodegmi C. gingivalis C. granulosa C. haemolytica C. leadbetteri C. ochracea C. sputigena

Genus of bacteria

Capnocytophaga is a genus of Gram-negative bacteria. Normally found in the oropharyngeal tract of mammals, they are involved in the pathogenesis of some animal bite wounds and periodontal diseases.

== Taxonomy ==
The term Capnocytophaga comes from "capno-" for its dependence on CO_{2} and "cytophaga" for its flexibility and mobility shift (gliding motility). It belongs to the family Flavobacteriaceae, order Flavobacteriales. This genus includes eight different species: C. ochracea, C. gingivalis, C. granulosa, C. haemolytica, C. sputigena, C. leadbetteri (isolated oral cavity of humans), C. canimorsus, and C. cynodegmi (isolated from the oral cavity of animals). Many strains have also been described whose classification remains uncertain.

=== Bacteriological isolation and identification ===
Capnocytophaga spp. are fusiform Gram-negative bacilli, and they are part of the oral commensal flora. Microscopic observation revealed a high degree of polymorphism with a variation in the size and appearance depending on the strain and culture conditions. This polymorphism is also reflected in the observation of colonies (orange-pigmented colonies, spreading on agar, etc.). Capnocytophaga spp. are capnophilic bacteria; they can live only in environments where the concentration of carbon dioxide is greater than that of the atmosphere (at least 5% CO_{2}). They can also grow anaerobically. They require enriched media, typically blood agar, incubated at 37 °C. The isolation of strains of Capnocytophaga from polymicrobial samples is also possible on selective media containing antibiotics.

The identification is carried out through various biochemical tests, used for the identification of Gram-negative bacterial species, and rapid determination of enzymatic reactions. The diagnosis is delayed because of the slow and difficult growth of Capnocytophaga (48 to 72 hours). The molecular techniques (16S rDNA PCR and sequencing), and mass spectrometry appear as attractive methods for reliable identification to the genus. The identification at the species level remains difficult when a single method is used.

== Pathogenicity ==
Capnocytophaga is a commensal genus considered as an opportunistic pathogen. These bacteria are involved in different types of infections, the severity of which depends on the immune status of the patient. In the literature, cases were reported in immunocompromised and immunocompetent patients. In immunocompetent patients, these bacteria belong to the oral bacterial community responsible for periodontal infections affecting and destroying the supporting tissues of teeth (periodontal tissue). Capnocytophaga strains are often isolated from periodontal pockets, but also from apical and periodontal abscesses, in association with other bacterial periodontal species. This condition increases alveolar bone loss, attachment loss, tooth mobility, and finally tooth loss. It can cause other diseases widely reported in the literature, such as bacteremia (potentially complicated by septic shock), infections of the musculoskeletal system (osteomyelitis, arthritis), lung (empyema, lung abscess), digestive (peritonitis), maternal-fetal (ovarian abscess, chorioamnionitis), eye (conjunctivitis), heart (endocarditis) or brain (meningitis). Capnocytophaga is clinically important in pediatric oncology and hematology, especially when patients are in aplasia. C. canimorsus and C. cynodegmi are commonly transmitted by dog bites and known to cause sepsis, potentially complicated by thrombotic thrombocytopenic purpura and hemolytic uremic syndrome, in immunocompromised patients. Other complications from infection can include heart attack, kidney failure, gangrene and amputation of limbs.

== Resistance to antibiotics ==
Capnocytophaga spp. are usually susceptible to antibiotics, but the emergence of beta-lactam-resistant strains has been observed as early as 1980. Genes for antibiotic resistance have gradually spread among other pathogenic bacterial species by horizontal gene transfer. Susceptibility to various beta-lactam antibiotics has been described as variable depending on the strain of Capnocytophaga. This resistance is often linked to the production of beta- lactamases. Most beta-lactamases identified in Bacteroides, Prevotella, and Capnocytophaga belong to the Ambler class A. Several beta-lactamases encoded by the chromosome or a plasmid and associated with mobile genetic elements have been described in Capnocytophaga spp. The most common are: CfxA, CfxA2, CepA, CblA, and/or CSP-1.

== The CfxA group of beta-lactamases ==
Capnocytophaga spp. can be resistant to third-generation cephalosporins, but remain susceptible to imipenem, cefoxitin, and amoxicillin combined with clavulanic acid. Although resistant strains are most frequently isolated in oral cavities, their prevalence is worrying, (Jolivet-Gougeon et al., 2008; Sixou et al., 2006). The CfxA broad spectrum beta- lactamases (CfxA, CfxA2 and CfxA3) belong to the group 2e of Bush classification. This class includes beta-lactamase enzymes with significant activity against cephalosporins and monobactams, rather than penicillins. Following the characterization of CfxA beta- lactamase in B. vulgatus and CfxA2 beta-lactamase in P. intermedia (nucleotide Genbank under accession number AF118110), a new group 2e of Bush classification named CfxA3 (nucleotide GenBank under accession number AF472622) has been characterized in C. ochracea E201 (Jolivet-Gougeon et al. 2004). The cfxA3 gene has 99% identity with cfxA of B. vulgatus and cfxA2 of P. intermedia. The analysis of the 966 bp nucleotide sequence showed that the gene encoding beta-lactamase CfxA3 in C. ochracea E201 differs from cfxA gene of B. vulgatus by substitution of two amino acids (K272E and Y239D) and from cfxA2 gene of P. intermedia by a substitution of one amino acid (Y239D). CfxA3 was different from CfxA2 because of an aspartic acid in place of tyrosine (at position 239) and from CfxA because of a glutamic acid instead of a lysine (at position 272).

== The CSP-1 beta- lactamase ==
In 2005, Handal et al. (2005b) identified a novel Ambler class A beta-lactamase called CSP-1 from a NOR C. sputigena strain, resistant to amoxicillin and first and second generation cephalosporins. The new beta- lactamase had 32% homology with CfxA, 41% with CblA and 38% with CepA. CSP-1 is encoded by the blaCSP -1 gene (GenBank nucleotide sequence under accession number GQ217533). The GC content (38%) of this gene, its genetic environment, the lack of conjugal transfer and its detection in two reference strains suggest that it is an intrinsic resistance gene located on chromosome.

== The beta- lactamases CepA/CblA ==
CepA (Chromosomal cephalosporinase from Bacteroides fragilis belonging to Ambler class A) is an endogenous cephalosporinase A described in Bacteroides fragilis. This beta- lactamase is ubiquitous, but frequently inactive. CepA is encoded by the cepA gene, most frequently vertically transferred (Boente et al. 2010). CblA (Chromosomal beta-lactamase from Bacteroides uniformis belonging to Ambler class A) is a specific endogenous cephalosporinase described in B. uniformis, susceptible to clavulanic acid. The homology is 43% between protein sequences CepA and CblA and 51% between nucleotide sequences. A comparison with protein sequence alignment by cepA with other beta- lactamases reveals the conservation of at least four common elements of Ambler class A.

== Other acquired resistance ==
According to studies, different sensitivities were reported for macrolides, rifampin, quinolones, metronidazole, vancomycin, and aminoglycosides, but the mechanism involved is not precisely described.

== Treatment of infections ==
The high frequency of strains producing beta-lactamase limit the use of single beta-lactam antibiotics as first-line treatment, which underlies the need to test the in vitro susceptibility of clinical isolates. Many antimicrobial treatments were used despite a lack of randomized trials and guidelines relating to the duration of treatment according to infected sites. The imipenem/cilastatin, clindamycin, or combinations containing an inhibitor of beta-lactamases (e.g. Amoxicillin/clavulanic acid, ampicillin/sulbactam and piperacillin/tazobactam) are always effective and their use can be recommended. For Capnocytophaga canimorsus, the drug of choice is penicillin G, if it is susceptible.
