= Ballance's sign =

- Purpose: seen in splenic rupture

Ballance's sign is used in medical diagnosis. Its indications are dullness to percussion in the left flank LUQ and shifting dullness to percussion in the right flank seen with splenic rupture/hematoma. During trauma assessment of the abdomen, "Ballance's sign" may be observed upon exam.

The dullness in the left flank is due to coagulated blood, the shifting dullness on the right due to fluid blood.

It is named for Charles Alfred Ballance, an English surgeon, 1856–1936.
