= Referred pain =

Pain perceived at a location other than the site of the painful stimulus

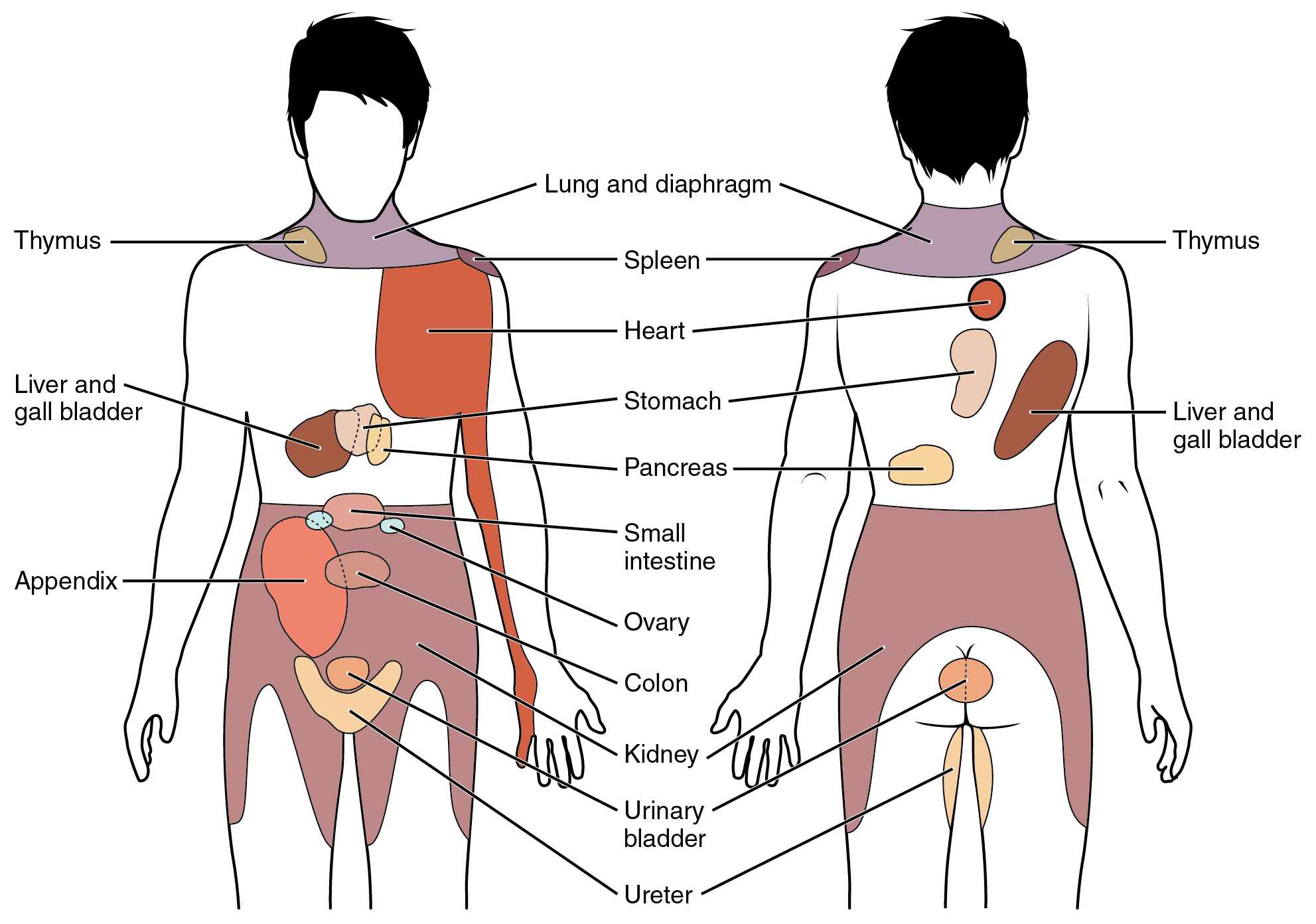
- Conscious perception of visceral sensations map to specific regions of the body, as shown in this chart. Some sensations are felt locally, whereas others are perceived as affecting areas that are quite distant from the involved organ.

Identifiers
- MeSH: D053591

Referred pain, also called reflective pain, is pain perceived at a location other than the site of the painful stimulus. An example is the case of angina pectoris brought on by a myocardial infarction (heart attack), where pain is often felt in the left side of the neck, left shoulder, and back rather than in the thorax (chest), the site of the injury. The International Association for the Study of Pain has not officially defined the term; hence, several authors have defined it differently. Referred pain has been described since the late 1880s. Despite an increasing amount of literature on the subject, the biological mechanism of referred pain is unknown, although there are several hypotheses.

Radiating pain is slightly different from referred pain; for example, the pain related to a myocardial infarction could either be referred or radiating pain from the chest. Referred pain is when the pain is located away from or adjacent to the organ involved; for instance, when a person has pain only in their jaw or left arm, but not in the chest. Radiating pain would have an origin, where the patient can perceive pain, but the pain also spreads ("radiates") out from this origin point to cause the pain to be perceived in a wider area in addition.

== Characteristics ==
- The size of referred pain is related to the intensity and duration of ongoing/evoked pain.
- Temporal summation is a potent mechanism for generation of referred muscle pain.
- Central hyperexcitability is important for the extent of referred pain.
- Patients with chronic musculoskeletal pains have enlarged referred pain areas to experimental stimuli. The proximal spread of referred muscle pain is seen in patients with chronic musculoskeletal pain and very seldom is it seen in healthy individuals.
- Modality-specific somatosensory changes occur in referred areas, which emphasize the importance of using a multimodal sensory test regime for assessment.
- Referred pain is often experienced on the same side of the body as the source, but not always.

== Mechanism ==
There are several proposed mechanisms for referred pain. Currently there is no definitive consensus regarding which is correct. The cardiac general visceral sensory pain fibers follow the sympathetics back to the spinal cord and have their cell bodies located in thoracic dorsal root ganglia 1-4(5). As a general rule, in the thorax and abdomen, general visceral afferent (GVA) pain fibers follow sympathetic fibers back to the same spinal cord segments that gave rise to the preganglionic sympathetic fibers. The central nervous system (CNS) perceives pain from the heart as coming from the somatic portion of the body supplied by the thoracic spinal cord segments 1-4(5). Classically the pain associated with a myocardial infarction is located in the mid or left side of the chest where the heart is actually located. The pain can radiate to the left side of the jaw and into the left arm. Myocardial infarction can rarely present as referred pain and this usually occurs in people with diabetes or older age. Also, the dermatomes of this region of the body wall and upper limb have their neuronal cell bodies in the same dorsal root ganglia (T1-5) and synapse in the same second order neurons in the spinal cord segments (T1-5) as the general visceral sensory fibers from the heart. The CNS does not clearly discern whether the pain is coming from the body wall or from the viscera, but it perceives the pain as coming from somewhere on the body wall, i.e. substernal pain, left arm/hand pain, jaw pain.

=== Convergent-projection ===
This represents one of the earliest theories on the subject of referred pain. It is based on the work of W.A. Sturge and J. Ross from 1888 and later TC Ruch in 1961. Convergent projection proposes that afferent nerve fibers from tissues converge onto the same spinal neuron, and explains why referred pain is believed to be segmented in much the same way as the spinal cord. Additionally, experimental evidence shows that when local pain (pain at the site of stimulation) is intensified the referred pain is intensified as well.

Criticism of this model arises from its inability to explain why there is a delay between the onset of referred pain after local pain stimulation. Experimental evidence also shows that referred pain is often unidirectional. For example, stimulated local pain in the anterior tibial muscle causes referred pain in the ventral portion of the ankle; however referred pain moving in the opposite direction has not been shown experimentally. Lastly, the threshold for the local pain stimulation and the referred pain stimulation are different, but according to this model they should both be the same.

=== Convergence-facilitation ===
Convergence facilitation was conceived in 1893 by J MacKenzie based on the ideas of Sturge and Ross. He believed that the internal organs were insensitive to stimuli. Furthermore, he believed that non-nociceptive afferent inputs to the spinal cord created what he termed "an irritable focus". This focus caused some stimuli to be perceived as referred pain. However, his ideas did not gain widespread acceptance from critics due to its dismissal of visceral pain.

Recently this idea has regained some credibility under a new term, central sensitization. Central sensitization occurs when neurons in the spinal cord's dorsal horn or brainstem become more responsive after repeated stimulation by peripheral neurons, so that weaker signals can trigger them. The delay in appearance of referred pain shown in laboratory experiments can be explained due to the time required to create the central sensitization.

=== Axon-reflex ===
Axon reflex suggests that the afferent fiber is bifurcated before connecting to the dorsal horn. Bifurcated fibers do exist in muscle, skin, and intervertebral discs. Yet these particular neurons are rare and are not representative of the whole body. Axon-Reflex also does not explain the time delay before the appearance of referred pain, threshold differences for stimulating local and referred pain, and somatosensory sensibility changes in the area of referred pain.

=== Hyperexcitability ===
Hyperexcitability hypothesizes that referred pain has no central mechanism. However, it does say that there is one central characteristic that predominates. Experiments involving noxious stimuli and recordings from the dorsal horn of animals revealed that referred pain sensations began minutes after muscle stimulation. Pain was felt in a receptive field that was some distance away from the original receptive field. According to hyperexcitability, new receptive fields are created as a result of the opening of latent convergent afferent fibers in the dorsal horn. This signal could then be perceived as referred pain.

Several characteristics are in line with this mechanism of referred pain, such as dependency on stimulus and the time delay in the appearance of referred pain as compared to local pain. However, the appearance of new receptive fields, which is interpreted to be referred pain, conflicts with the majority of experimental evidence from studies including studies of healthy individuals. Furthermore, referred pain generally appears within seconds in humans as opposed to minutes in animal models. Some scientists attribute this to a mechanism or influence downstream in the supraspinal pathways. Neuroimaging techniques such as PET scans or fMRI may visualize the underlying neural processing pathways responsible in future testing.

=== Thalamic-convergence ===
Thalamic convergence suggests that referred pain is perceived as such due to the summation of neural inputs in the brain, as opposed to the spinal cord, from the injured area and the referred area. Experimental evidence on thalamic convergence is lacking. However, pain studies performed on monkeys revealed convergence of several pathways upon separate cortical and subcortical neurons.

== Examples ==
Location	Description
Upper chest/left limb	Myocardial ischaemia (the loss of blood flow to a part of the heart muscle tissue) is possibly the best known example of referred pain; the sensation can occur in the upper chest as a restricted feeling, or as an ache in the left shoulder, arm or even hand.
Head	"Ice-cream headache" or "brain freeze" is another example of referred pain, in which the vagus nerve or the trigeminal nerve in the throat and the palate, respectively, transmit pain signals following rapid cooling and rewarming of the capillaries in the sinuses.
General	Phantom limb pain, a type of referred pain, is the sensation of pain from a limb that has been lost or from which a person no longer receives physical signals. It is an experience almost universally reported by amputees and quadriplegics.
Right tip of scapula	Liver, gallbladder
Umbilicus	Pain in ovary
Left shoulder	Thoracic diaphragm, spleen (Kehr's sign), lung
Back	Low back pain
Palm of hand	Palmaris longus, a problem originating in the forearm might be felt in the palm, and not in the forearm.

== Laboratory testing methods ==
Pain is studied in a laboratory setting due to the greater amount of control that can be exerted. For example, the modality, intensity, and timing of painful stimuli can be controlled with much more precision. Within this setting there are two main ways that referred pain is studied.

=== Algogenic substances ===
In recent years several different chemicals have been used to induce referred pain including bradykinin, substance P, capsaicin, and serotonin. However, before any of these substances became widespread in their use a solution of hypertonic saline was used instead. Through various experiments it was determined that there were multiple factors that correlated with saline administration such as infusion rate, saline concentration, pressure, and amount of saline used. The mechanism by which the saline induces a local and referred pain pair is unknown. Some researchers have commented that it could be due to osmotic differences, however that is not verified.

=== Using electrical stimulation ===
Intramuscular electrical stimulation (IMES) of muscle tissue has been used in various experimental and clinical settings. The advantage to using an IMES system over a standard such as hypertonic saline is that IMES can be turned on and off. This allows the researcher to exert a much higher degree of control and precision in terms of the stimulus and the measurement of the response. The method is easier to carry out than the injection method as it does not require special training in how it should be used. The frequency of the electrical pulse can also be controlled. For most studies a frequency of about 10 Hz is needed to stimulate both local and referred pain.

Using this method it has been observed that significantly higher stimulus strength is needed to obtain referred pain relative to the local pain. There is also a strong correlation between the stimulus intensity and the intensity of referred and local pain. It is also believed that this method causes a larger recruitment of nociceptor units resulting in a spatial summation. This spatial summation results in a much larger barrage of signals to the dorsal horn and brainstem neurons.

== Use in clinical diagnosis and treatments ==
Referred pain can be indicative of nerve damage. A case study done on a 63-year-old man with an injury sustained during his childhood developed referred pain symptoms after his face or back was touched. After even a light touch, there was a shooting pain in his arm. The study concluded that his pain was possibly due to a neural reorganization which sensitized regions of his face and back after the nerve damage occurred. It is mentioned that this case is very similar to what phantom limb syndrome patients experience. This conclusion was based on experimental evidence gathered by V. S. Ramachandran in 1993, with the difference being that the arm that is in pain is still attached to the body.

=== Orthopedic diagnosis ===
From the above examples one can see why understanding of referred pain can lead to better diagnoses of various conditions and diseases. In 1981 physiotherapist Robin McKenzie described what he termed centralization. He concluded that centralization occurs when referred pain moves from a distal to a more proximal location. Observations in support of this idea were seen when patients would bend backward and forward during an examination.

Studies have reported that the majority of patients that experienced centralization were able to avoid spinal surgery through isolating the area of local pain. However, the patients who did not experience centralization had to undergo surgery to diagnose and correct the problems. As a result of this study there has been a further research into the elimination of referred pain through certain body movements.

One example of this is referred pain in the calf. McKenzie showed that the referred pain would move closer to the spine when the patient bent backwards in full extension a few times. More importantly, the referred pain would dissipate even after the movements were stopped.

=== General diagnosis ===
As with myocardial ischaemia, referred pain in a certain portion of the body can lead to a diagnosis of the correct local center. Somatic mapping of referred pain and the corresponding local centers has led to various topographic maps being produced to aid in pinpointing the location of pain based on the referred areas. For example, local pain stimulated in the esophagus is capable of producing referred pain in the upper abdomen, the oblique muscles, and the throat. Local pain in the prostate can radiate referred pain to the abdomen, lower back, and calf muscles. Kidney stones can cause visceral pain in the ureter as the stone is slowly passed into the excretory system. This can cause immense referred pain in the lower abdominal wall.

Further, recent research has found that ketamine, a sedative, is capable of blocking referred pain. The study was conducted on patients with fibromyalgia, a disease characterized by joint and muscle pain and fatigue. These patients were looked at specifically due to their increased sensitivity to nociceptive stimuli. Furthermore, referred pain appears in a different pattern in fibromyalgic patients than non-fibromyalgic patients. Often this difference manifests as a difference in terms of the area that the referred pain is found (distal vs. proximal) as compared to the local pain. The area is also much more exaggerated owing to the increased sensitivity.

== See also ==
- Visceral pain
