= Wandering spleen =

- Other names: Pelvic spleen, displaced spleen, drifting spleen, splenoptosis, floating spleen, splenic ptosis
- A picture of an enlarged spleen taken using medical ultrasonography.
- Specialty: Angiology
- Causes: Connective tissue disease, complications of pregnancy

Wandering spleen (or pelvic spleen) is a rare medical disease caused by the loss or weakening of the ligaments that help to hold the spleen stationary.

== Symptoms and signs ==
Although symptoms include an enlargement in the size of the spleen, or a change from the spleen's original position to another location, usually in either other parts of the abdomen or into the pelvis. This ability to move to other locations is commonly attributed to the spleen's pedicle being abnormally long.

Physical factors may cause ischuria, constipation, as well as numerous spleen-related diseases such as hypersplenism, thrombocytopenia, and lymphoma. Blocking of the arteries and torsion (twisting that interrupts the blood supply to that organ) in the spleen can also result in abdominal pain or swelling. However, lack of visible symptoms — except in incidents of abdominal pain — makes the disease difficult for doctors to diagnose, though medical imaging techniques such as medical ultrasonography, magnetic resonance imaging, or computed tomography can be used to confirm its occurrence. Characteristics of the disorder include the loss, weakening, or malformation of the ligaments that help to keep the spleen located in the upper left part of the abdomen.

== Cause ==
Though not a genetic disease, wandering spleen is often found at birth. It can occur in adults as the result of injuries and other similar conditions that cause the ligaments to weaken, such as connective tissue disease or pregnancy. Wandering spleen (splenoptosis) predisposes the spleen to complications such as torsion, splenic infarction, pancreatic necrosis and rarely pseudocyst formation.

== Treatment ==
The usual treatment is splenopexy, fixation of the spleen, but if there is no blood flow after unwinding the spleen through detorsion then splenectomy must be performed. Although there have been few reported cases of treatment through laparoscopic surgery due to the rarity of the disease, it has been proven to be an effective surgical technique.

== Prevalence ==
Wandering spleen is most commonly diagnosed in young children as well as women between the ages of 20 and 40. Even so, the disease is very rare and fewer than 500 occurrences of the disease have been reported as of 2005, of which around 148 (including both children and adult cases) were documented to have been from between 1960 and 1992. Less than 0.5% of all splenectomies, surgical removal of the spleen, are performed due to having this disorder. In 1992, the youngest case of the literature of torsion of wandering spleen at two days of birth was reported in Lebanon, by Dr Edouard Sayad.

== Media ==
Susan Mayer, in season 2 of the television show Desperate Housewives, had an operation to fix her wandering spleen.
