= Hans Kehr =

German surgeon (1862–1916)

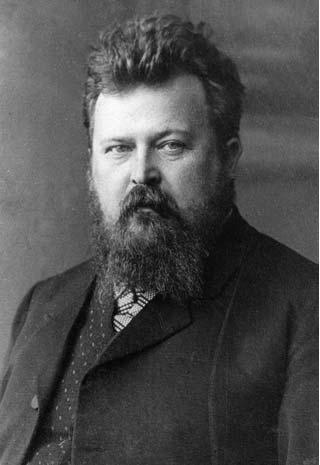
Hans Kehr (1862-1916)

Johannes Otto Kehr (27 April 1862 – 20 May 1916) was a German surgeon and professor of surgery. Kehr was born in Waltershausen, Saxe-Coburg and Gotha.

He practiced surgery at a private clinic in Halberstädt, and from 1910 worked in Berlin. He is known for the development of operative procedures for the treatment of gall bladder and bile duct diseases.

In the late 19th century, Kehr popularized the cholecystectomy for the treatment of gallstones. He is credited with performing 2600 operations of the biliary tract during his career.

== Eponyms ==
His name is lent to Kehr's sign, which is in an indication of acute pain in the left shoulder associated with a ruptured spleen. Also, he popularized a device for biliary drainage that today is known as "Kehr's T-tube".

== Selected publications ==
- Die chirurgische Behandlung der Gallensteinkrankheit, 1896
- Die in meiner Klinik geübte Technik der Gallensteinoperationen, 1905
- Die Praxis der Gallenwege-Chirurgie in Wort und Bild, 2 volumes- 1913: (life works of Kehr)
- Chirurgie der Gallenwege, 1913
