= Paul Fridolin Kehr =

German historian and archivist (1860–1944)

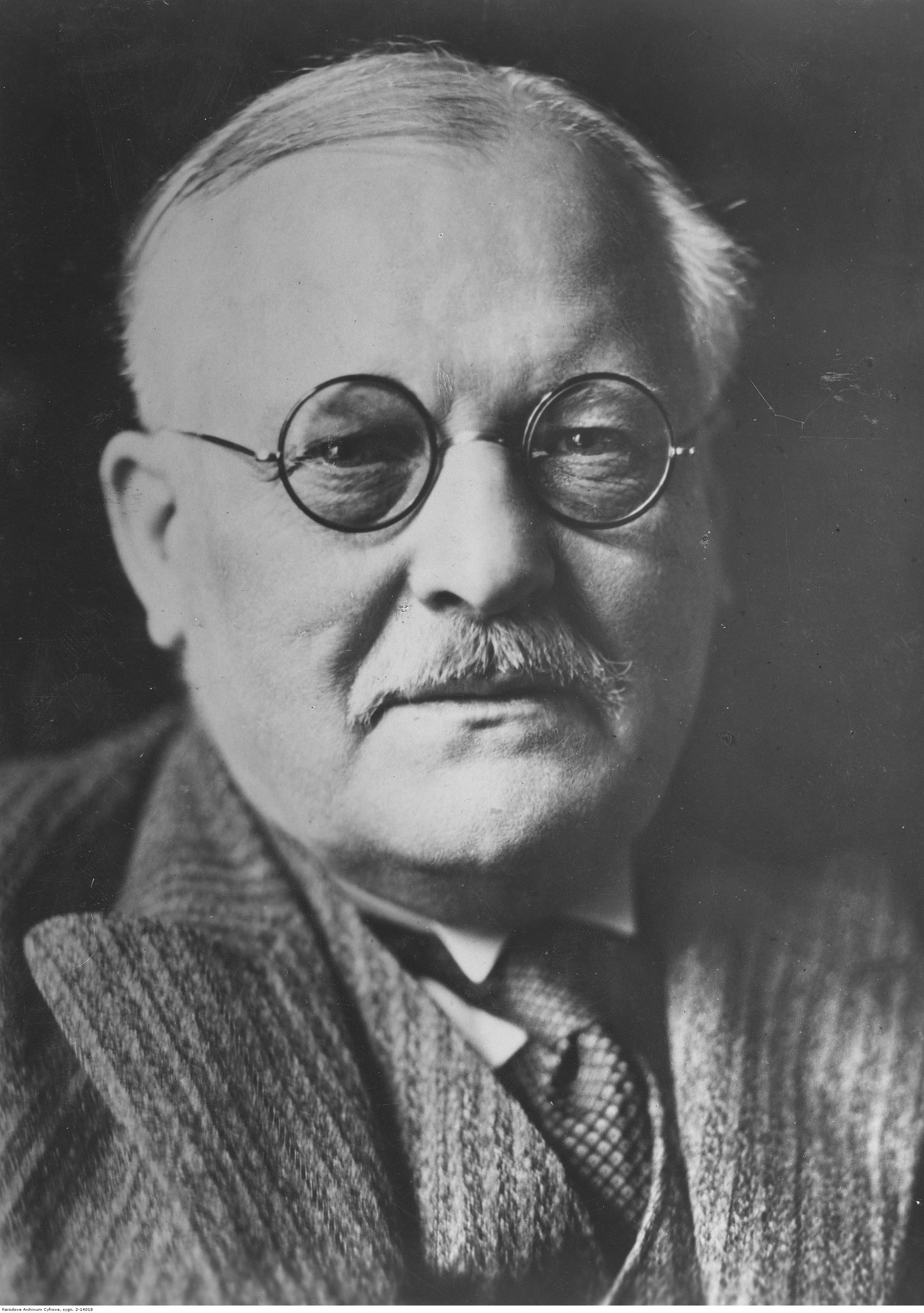
Image of Paul Fridolin Kehr

Paul Fridolin Kehr (28 December 1860, Waltershausen – 9 November 1944, Wässerndorf) was a German historian and archivist.

In 1893, he was appointed professor of history and auxiliary sciences at the University of Marburg, and two years later, procured the same title at the University of Göttingen (from 1895).

In 1903, he was named director of the Prussian Historical Institute in Rome, and in 1915 became general director of the Prussian State Archives. During the same year, he became chairman of the central directorate of "Monumenta Germaniae Historica", as well as director of the Kaiser Wilhelm Institute for German History. In 1940, he was awarded the Eagle Shield of the German Reich with the distinction "The outstanding researcher of medieval history". Kehr died in Wässerndorf and was buried in the private cemetery of those of Pölnitz near Hundshaupten Castle.

== Publications ==
Kehr is best known for documentary research on the Papacy and of German imperial history. He was editor or co-editor of the following:

- Päpstliche Urkunden und Regesten aus den Jahren 1358–78 (two volumes 1886–1889) – Papal documents and summaries from the years 1358–78.
- Die Urkunden Otto III. (1889) – The documents of Otto III.
- Regesta Pontificum Romanorum ("Italia pontifica", seven volumes, Berlin 1906–1925) – documents issued by the papacy relevant to Italian churches
- Germania sacra (Volume 1, Berlin 1929).
