= Splenic tumor =

- Specialty: Oncology

A splenic tumor is a rare form of tumor that may be malignant or benign. Malignant forms include lymphoma and sarcoma.

Lymphoma is the most common malignant splenic tumor.
