= Overwhelming post-splenectomy infection =

- Other names: Overwhelming post-splenectomy sepsis (OPSS)
- Specialty: Infectious disease
- Usual onset: 24–48 hours following presentation with mild viral symptoms
- Causes: Exposure to pathogens following splenectomy or asplenia
- Risk factors: Splenectomy in the past 2–3 years, removal of spleen for hematological reasons, being under the age of 2
- Prognosis: Almost invariably fatal without treatment

An overwhelming post-splenectomy infection (OPSI) is a rare but rapidly fatal infection occurring in individuals following removal (or permanent dysfunction) of the spleen. The infections are typically characterized by either meningitis or sepsis, and are caused by encapsulated organisms including Streptococcus pneumoniae. It is a medical emergency and requires immediate treatment. Death has been reported to occur within 12 hours.

The spleen is necessary for protection against encapsulated bacteria and when removed by splenectomy it can lead to rapid infection by encapsulated bacteria. It rapidly progresses from mild viral symptoms to sepsis.

Another source of infection are species of Babesia, which are tick-borne parasites that cause babesiosis.

== Signs and symptoms ==
OPSI may initially present with mild viral symptoms such as fever or coughing, however later in infection symptoms may include shakes, shivers, chills, diarrhea, vomiting, malaise, myalgia, headache and abdominal pain.

The disease progresses rapidly from the above mentioned symptoms to coma to refractory septic shock and finally death in as little as 24 hours.

== Mechanism ==
The spleen contains many macrophages (part of the reticuloendothelial system), which are immune cells that phagocytose and destroy bacteria. In particular, these macrophages are activated when bacteria are bound by IgG antibodies (IgG1 or IgG3) or the complement component C3b. These types of antibodies and complement are immune substances called opsonizers, molecules that bind to the surface of bacteria to facilitate phagocytosis.

When the spleen is no longer present (asplenia), IgG and C3b are still bound to bacteria, but they cannot be removed from the blood circulation due to the loss of the splenic macrophages. Hence the bacteria are free to cause infection.

Patients without a spleen often need immunizations against pathogens that normally require opsonization and phagocytosis by macrophages in the spleen. These include common human pathogens with bacterial capsules (Streptococcus pneumoniae, Salmonella typhi, Neisseria meningitidis, E. coli, Hemophilus influenzae, Streptococcus agalactiae, Klebsiella pneumoniae, Pseudomonas aeruginosa). Capsules made of polysaccharides (sugars) permit bacteria to evade phagocytosis by macrophages alone, since only proteins are directly recognized by macrophages in phagocytosis. So humoral immunity in forms of IgG and complement proteins is the human immune system's response against bacterial capsules.

== Prevention ==
Measures to prevent OPSI include vaccination, prophylactic antibiotics and patient education.

=== Patient education ===
Knowledge of the risks of asplenia correlates with a greatly reduced risk of OPSI, thus patient education is vital to preventing OPSI and may be the most important factor for preventing OPSI. More and more people are increasingly getting their healthcare information from the internet and the lack of reliable, readable and comprehensive information on the risks of asplenia and splenectomy poses a preventable risk factor for asplenic individuals. The majority (as many as 84%) of asplenic individuals are unaware of the risks of asplenia. Encouraging the wearing of bracelets with information about the condition, the carrying of antibiotics, seeking medical advice before travel, especially to places where malaria and babesia is endemic and seeking immediate medical attention following a bite from an animal has been shown to reduce OPSI risk.

=== Vaccination ===
The Centers for Disease Control and Prevention's annual vaccine recommendations includes specifics for individuals without a functioning spleen.

The Green Book (immunisation guidance, UK) in chapter 7 covers immunisation of people with underlying medical conditions that affect immunity which includes asplenic patients.

As there are a range of different pneumococcal vaccines, the patient should be offered the most up to date ones (typically 23 valent polysaccharide vaccine and 13 valent conjugate vaccine), if they have not had them already as part of standard schedule. Repeat doses are recommended in patients without a spleen.

The CDC recommends against live vaccines and has specific advice for travellers, which includes malaria avoidance for asplenic individuals.

== Prognosis ==
OPSI is almost always fatal without treatment, but modern treatment has decreased the mortality to approximately 40–70 percent. Individuals with OPSI are most commonly treated with antibiotics and supportive care.

== Epidemiology ==
The risk of OPSI is 0.23–0.42 percent per year, with a lifetime risk of 5 percent. Most infections occur in the first few years following splenectomy, but the risk of OPSI is lifelong.

The risk is greatest for children and elderly (70+ years old), but it can happen at any age. Greater risk is associated with splenectomy for hematological conditions such as sickle cell anemia, thalassemia and tumours when compared to splenectomy due to trauma.
