= Splenic injury =

Injury to the spleen

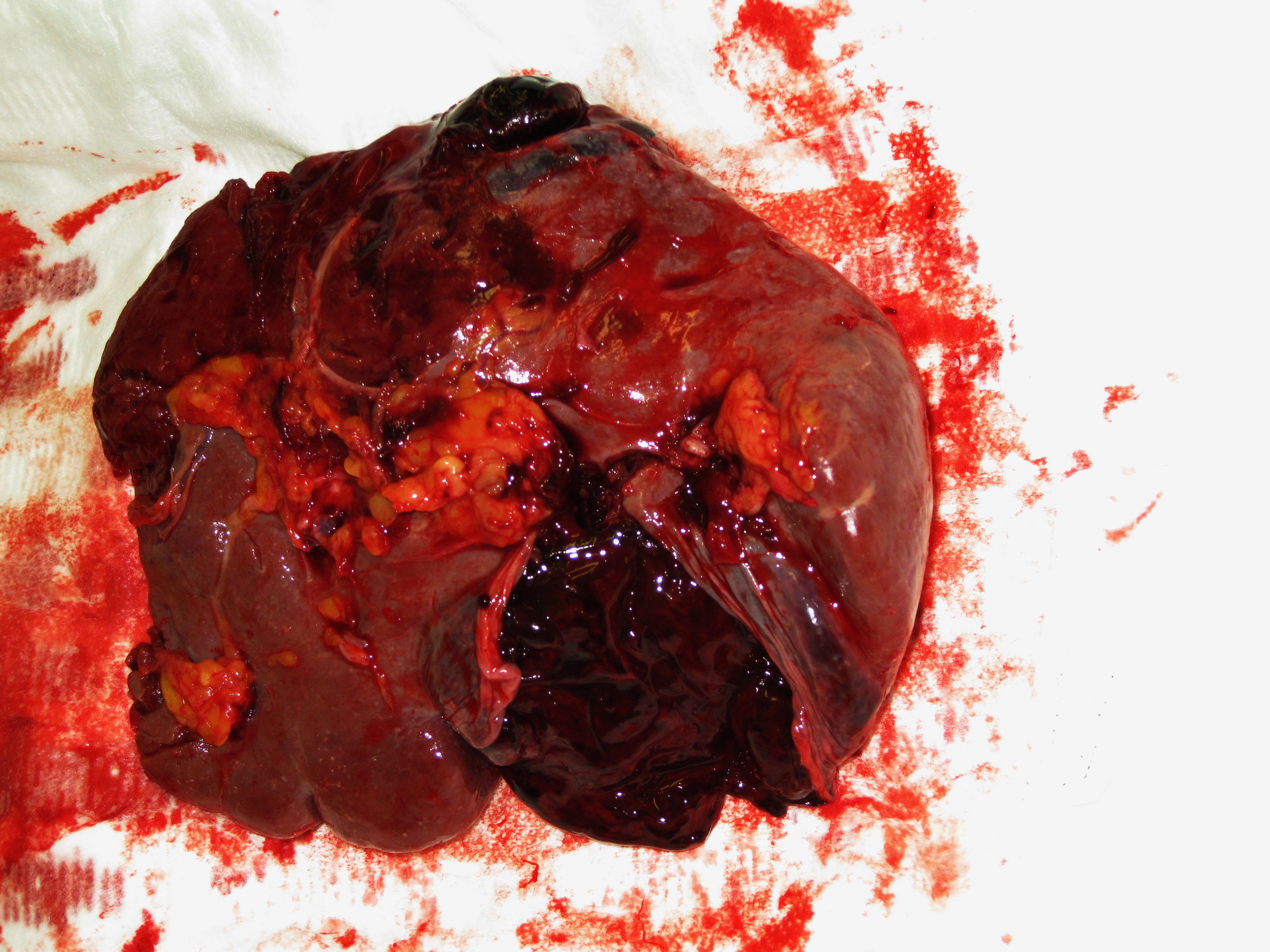
- Spleen ruptured by trauma
- Specialty: Emergency medicine

A splenic injury, which includes a ruptured spleen, is any injury to the spleen. The rupture of a normal spleen can be caused by trauma, such as a traffic collision.

== Signs and symptoms ==
In minor injuries with little bleeding, there may be abdominal pain, tenderness in the epigastrium and pain in the left flank. Often there is a sharp pain in the left shoulder, known as Kehr's sign. In larger injuries with more extensive bleeding, signs of hypovolemic shock are most prominent. This might include a rapid pulse, low blood pressure, rapid breathing, and paleness.

== Causes ==
The most common cause of a ruptured spleen is blunt abdominal trauma, such as in traffic collisions or sports accidents. In an autopsy study of fatal blunt abdominal trauma from India, in which road traffic collisions (particularly involving motorcyclists) accounted for 70.3% of cases, the type of splenic injury was significantly associated with the cause of the trauma. Direct, penetrating injuries (for example, stab or gunshot wounds) are rare.

Non-traumatic causes are less common. These include infectious diseases, medical procedures such as colonoscopy, haematological diseases, medications, and pregnancy.

In less than one percent of cases of infectious mononucleosis, splenic rupture may occur.

== Diagnosis ==
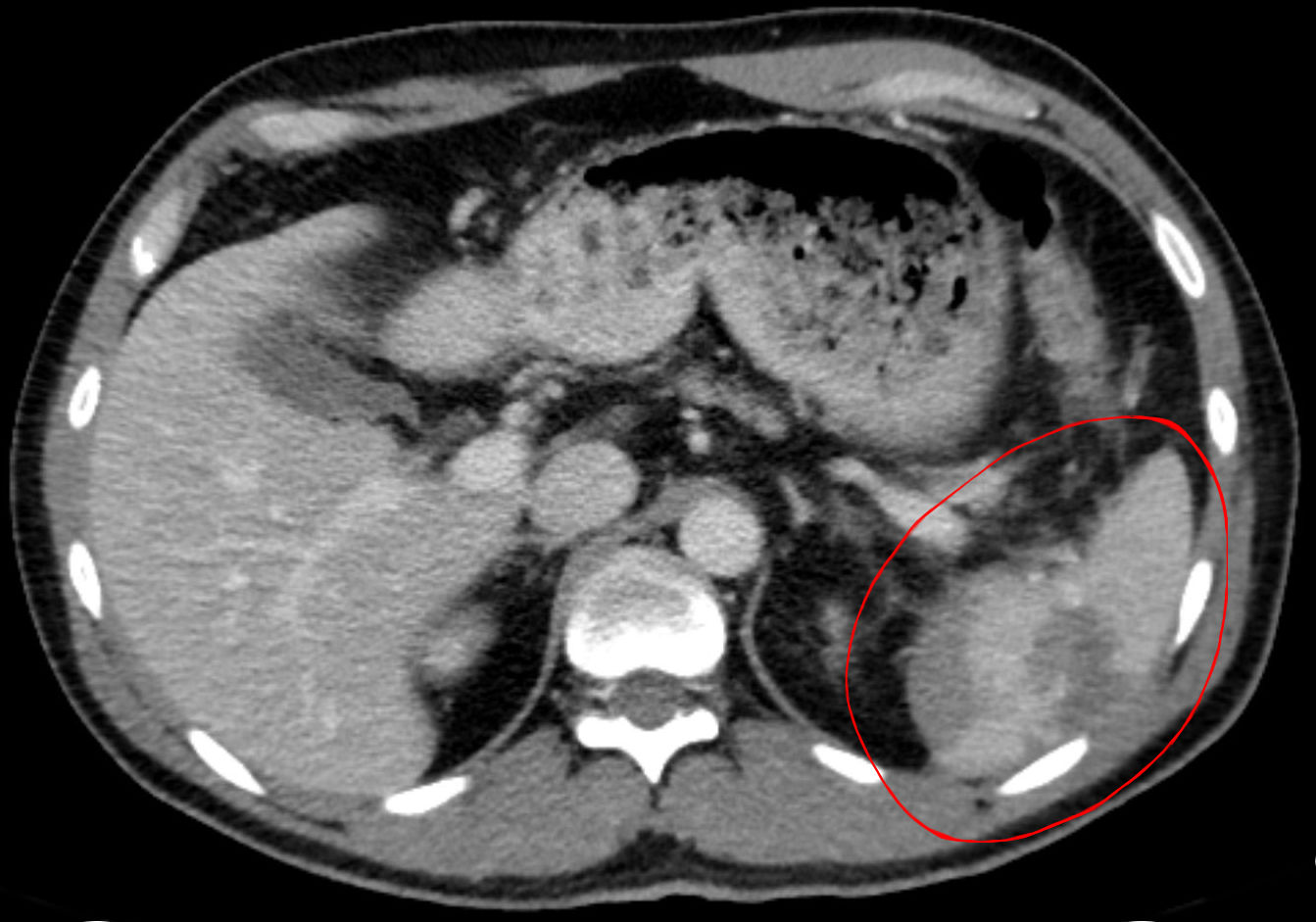
Traumatic rupture of the spleen on contrast enhanced axial CT (portal venous phase)

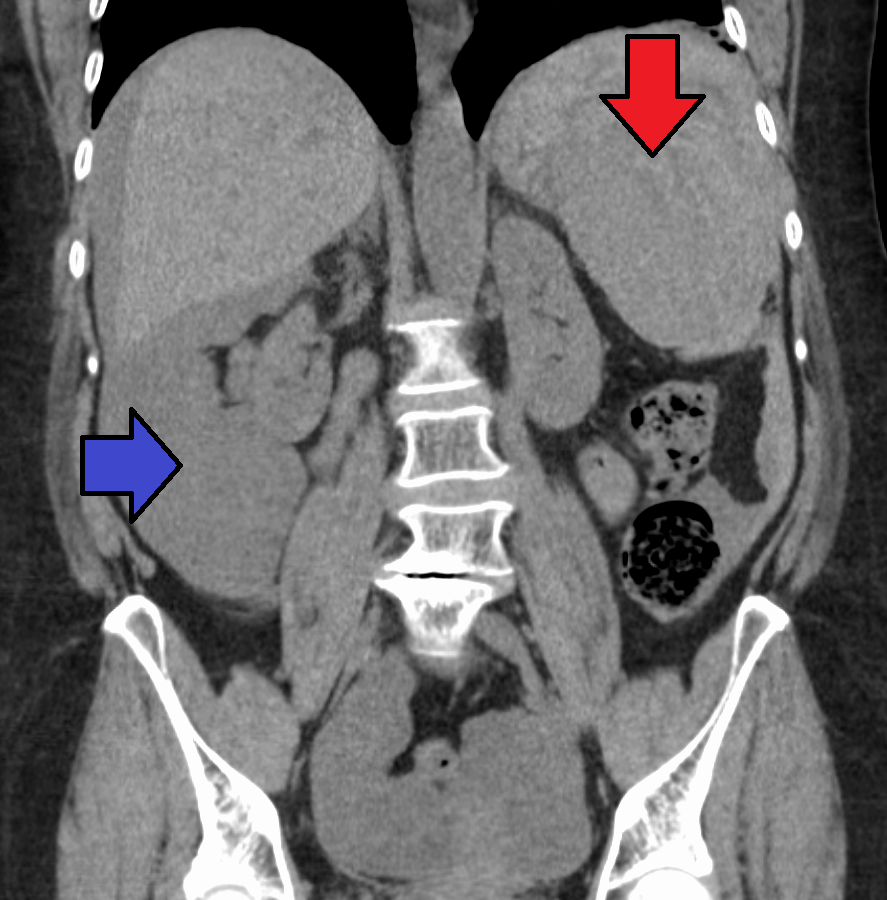
Splenic hematoma resulting in free abdominal blood

Splenic rupture is usually evaluated by FAST ultrasound of the abdomen. Generally this is not specific to splenic injury; however, it is useful to determine the presence of free floating blood in the peritoneum. A diagnostic peritoneal lavage, while not ideal, may be used to evaluate the presence of internal bleeding a person who is hemodynamically unstable. The FAST exam typically serves to evaluate the need to perform a CT scan. Computed tomography with IV contrast is the preferred imaging study as it can provide high quality images of the full peritoneal cavity.

=== Organ injury scale ===
AAST (American Association for the Surgery of Trauma) Organ Injury Scaling: Splenic Injury Grading

Splenic injury scale classification
Grade	Color	Subcapsular hematoma	Laceration
1	Blue	<10% surface area	<1 cm parenchymal depth
2	Green	10–50% surface area	1–3 cm parenchymal depth
3	Yellow	>50% surface area or expanding	>3-cm parenchymal depth
4	Orange	Major devascularization (>25% of spleen)	25 – 75% of a splenic lobe
5	Red	Completely shattered spleen	>75% of a splenic lobe (or splenic avulsion)

Calculators have been developed that facilitate grading of splenic injury based on imaging findings.

== Treatment ==
Because a splenic rupture permits large amounts of blood to leak into the abdominal cavity, it can result in shock and death. Generally a nonoperative approach is chosen in those who are hemodynamically stable with non-worsening symptoms. During this period of nonoperative management strict bed rest between 24 and 72 hours with careful monitoring along with a CT seven days after the injury.

Splenic artery embolization is a minimally invasive procedure and, where successful, avoids splenectomy.

If an individual's spleen is enlarged, as is frequent in mononucleosis, most physicians will advise against activities (such as contact sports) where injury to the abdomen could be catastrophic.

Patients whose spleens have been removed via a splenectomy must receive immunizations to help prevent infections such as pneumonia. This helps to replace the lost function of this organ.

== Epidemiology ==
The spleen is one of the abdominal organs most often injured in blunt trauma, although its ranking relative to the liver varies between studies. In an autopsy series of 185 fatal blunt abdominal trauma cases from Thiruvananthapuram, India (2016–2017), the spleen was injured in 44 cases (23.8%), less often than the liver (52.4%). Laceration was the predominant type of splenic injury, seen in 37 of the 44 cases.

== See also ==
- Splenomegaly
- Kehr's sign
- Ballance's sign

== Bibliography ==
- Feliciano, David V.; Mattox, Kenneth L.; Moore, Ernest J. (2012). Trauma, Seventh Edition (Trauma (Moore)). McGraw-Hill Professional. ISBN 978-0-07-166351-9.
- Trunkey, Donald (2008). Current Therapy of Trauma and Surgical Critical Care (1st ed.). Philadelphia: Mosby. ISBN 978-0-323-04418-9.
