= Kehr's sign =

- Differential diagnosis: Hemorrhage peritoneal cavity

Kehr's sign is the occurrence of acute pain in the tip of the shoulder due to the presence of blood or other irritants in the peritoneal cavity when a person is lying down and the legs are elevated. Kehr's sign in the left shoulder is considered a classic symptom of a ruptured spleen. May result from diaphragmatic or peridiaphragmatic lesions, renal calculi, splenic injury or ruptured ectopic pregnancy.

Kehr's sign is a classic example of referred pain: irritation of the diaphragm is signaled by the phrenic nerve as pain in the area above the collarbone. This is because the supraclavicular nerves have the same cervical nerves origin as the phrenic nerve, C3, C4, and C5.

The discovery of this is often attributed to a German gall bladder surgeon named Hans Kehr, but extensive studies into research he conducted during his life shows inconclusive evidence as to whether he actually discovered it.

== See also ==
- Ruptured spleen
