= Scissors =

Hand-operated cutting tool

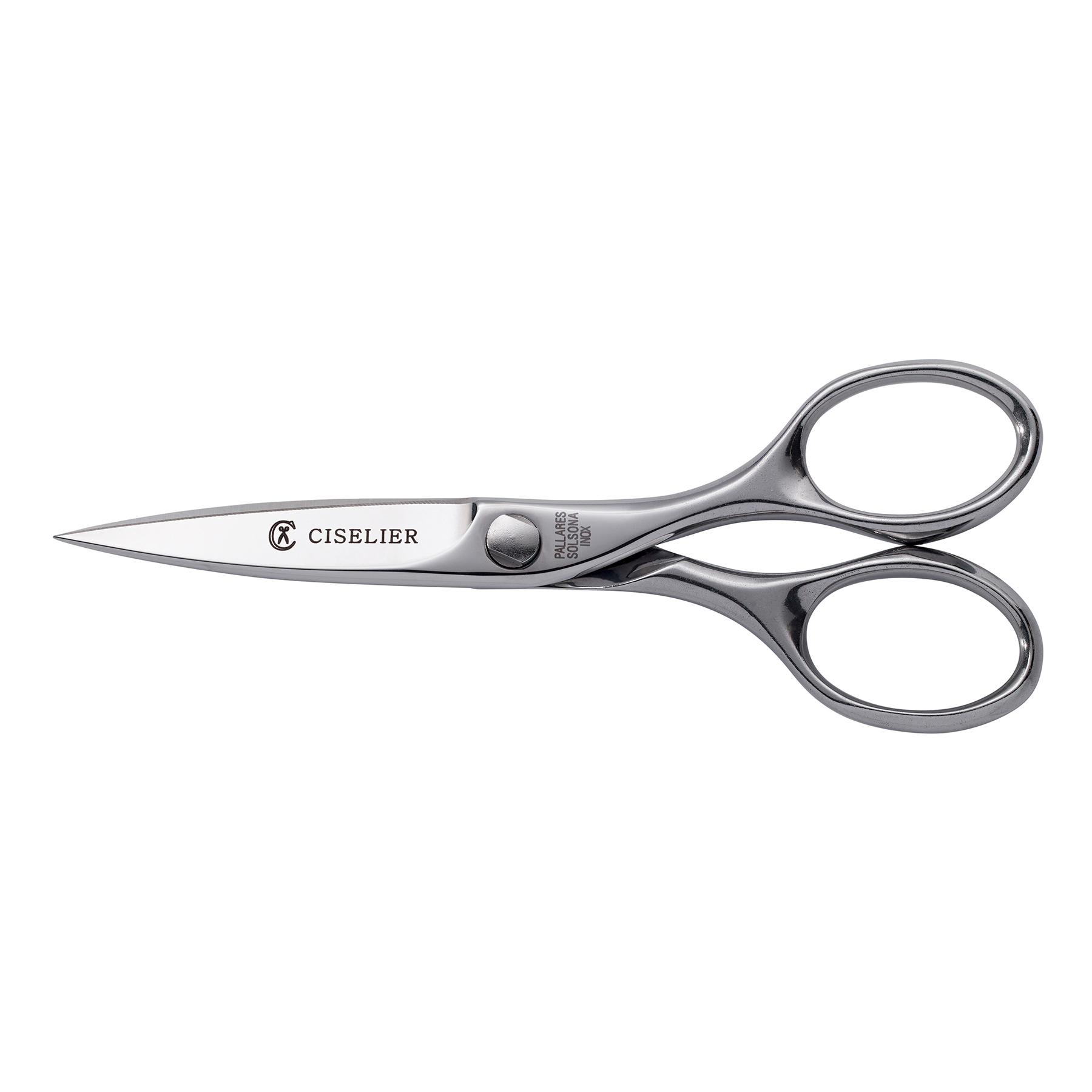
A pair of standard scissors

A video showing scissors being used to cut a piece of card stock

Scissors or shears are hand-operated cutting tools that consist of a pair of pivoting blades whose sharpened edges slide firmly against and past each other when the handles (shank) on the opposite side of the pivot are squeezed shut. This causes the target material in between the blades to be divided by the combined effort of both cutting and shearing. Scissors are usually used for cutting thin materials such as paper, cardboard, metal foil, cloth, rope and wire, although a large variety of scissors/shears exist for specialized purposes, and their design details often dictate which is best for the intended job.

While all scissors largely follow the same working principle, heavy-duty scissors intended for cutting tough materials tend to be called shears instead of scissors (e.g. pruning shears and grass shears), and some larger, two-handed implements are called trimmers instead (e.g. hedge trimmer). Choosing the optimal type of scissors/shears is crucial, as otherwise it can cause unwanted damage to the target material and/or the instrument itself. For example, hair-cutting shears and kitchen shears are functionally equivalent scissors, but hair-cutting shears have specific blade angles ideal for cutting heaped bundles of hair, and using the incorrect type of scissors will result in increased damage or split ends, or both, by breaking the hair; kitchen shears, also known as kitchen scissors, are intended for cutting and trimming tough food materials such as meat, tendon and bones. Surgical scissors, used to divide tissues and trim/reshape implants during surgical operations, have an even greater variety to deal with different anatomical and procedural circumstances.

Most scissors have a ringed handle to allow readily opening for repeated cutting, and some even have spring between the shanks to assist opening (especially for shears with straight handle). While historically inexpensive, mass-produced scissors often have bare metal handles, modern scissors are often designed ergonomically with composite thermoplastic and rubber covering on handles, which are more comfortable for the hand.

== Terminology ==
The noun scissors is treated as a plural noun and therefore takes a plural verb (e.g., these scissors are). Alternatively, the tool is referred to by the singular phrase a pair of scissors. In everyday language, the words shears and snips are used to describe similar instruments that are larger in size and for heavier cutting. Archaeologists distinguish between shears with a bow (the older, simpler technology) and scissors with a pivot (the newer, more difficult technology).

== History ==
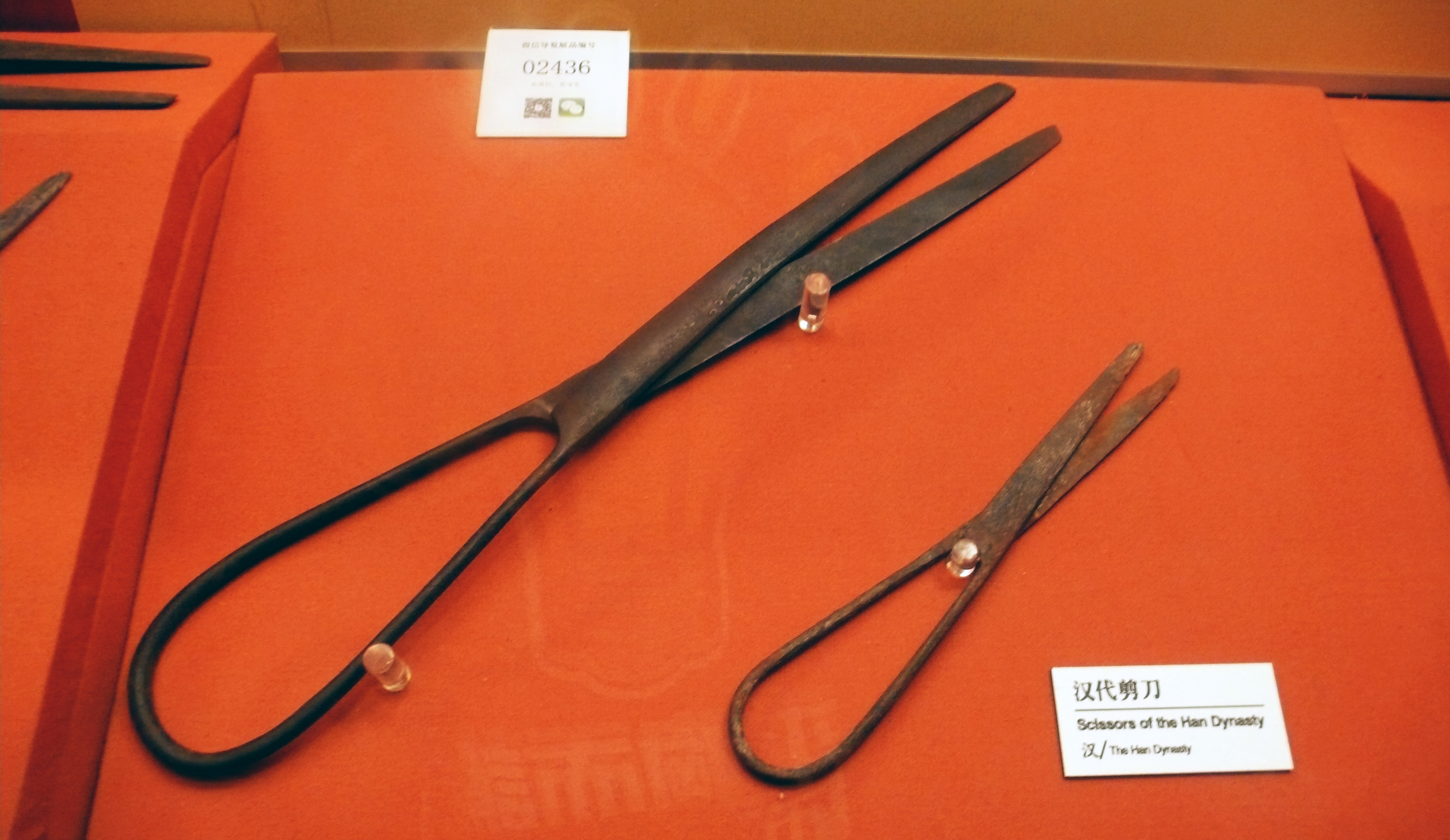
Han dynasty shears, a typical Iron Age technology all over Eurasia

These bronze scissors are thought to date to the Goryeo dynasty in medieval Korea. Walters 541959

In sixteenth-century Europe, scissors were associated with sewing and embroidery. New Modelbüch allen Nägerin u. Sydenstickern (title page, 1r), print, Hans Hoffman (MET, 30.59.2(1r))

In Europe, shears with a bow appear around 1000 BCE. At that time, they seem to have been rare because there were few common tasks which they did better than a knife. Hair could be trimmed with a razor and cloth was woven to shape. Gradually many Europeans came to shear their sheep rather than plucking or combing the wool from the animal, and this task required shears or scissors. Scissors with a pivot became common in north-west Europe around the 13th and 14th century CE and were useful for the increasingly elaborate tailoring of the period. Scissors offer the precision of a knife with the protection for the underlying surface of shears. By the 15th century, large scissors like modern tin snips were also used to cut iron and steel in trades such as armouring. Fastening one arm to a block of wood created a powerful lever action. However, making long straight blades which twist just enough to meet perfectly as the handles are squeezed is difficult, so simple bow shears remained common. One dealer estimates that a pair of scissors blades are at least ten times as much work as a knife.

=== Early manufacture ===
The Hangzhou Zhang Xiaoquan Company in Hangzhou, China, has been manufacturing pivoted scissors made of a hand-forged, hardened steel cutting edge inlaid in an iron frame since 1663. Company founder Zhang Sijia pioneered this design during the Ming dynasty as early as 1580. Modern Zhang Xiaoquan scissors, in common use throughout China, are still produced today using the same design and hand-forged construction methods.

In 1761, Robert Hinchliffe of Sheffield produced the first pair of scissors made of cast steel intended for the mass market. His major challenge was to form the bows; first, he made them solid, then drilled a hole, and then filed away metal to make this large enough to admit the user's fingers. This process was laborious, and Hinchliffe improved upon it in order to increase production. He achieved strong sales in London and elsewhere.

=== Modern manufacturing regions ===
==== China ====
The vast majority of global scissor manufacturing takes place in China. As of 2019, China was responsible for 64.3% of worldwide scissors exports. When combined with Chinese Taipei exports, this rises to 68.3%.

The Hangzhou Zhang Xiaoquan Company, founded in 1663, is one of the oldest continuously operating scissor manufacturers in the world. The company was nationalized in 1958 and now employs 1500 people who annually mass-produce an estimated seven million pairs of inexpensive scissors that retail for an average of US$4 each.

==== France ====
In the late 14th century, the English word "scissors" came into usage. It was derived from the Old French word cisoires, which referred to shears.

There are several historically important scissor-producing regions in France: Haute-Marne in Nogent-en Bassigny, Châtellereault, Thiers and Rouen. These towns, like many other scissor-producing communities, began with sabre, sword and bayonet production, which transitioned to scissors and other blades in the late 18th and early 19th centuries.

Thiers, in the Puy-de-Dôme department of Auvergne, remains an important centre of scissor and cutlery production. It is home to both the Musée de la Coutellerie, which showcases the town's 800-year history of blade-making, as well as Coutellia, an industry tradeshow that advertises itself as one of the largest annual gatherings of artisanal blade-makers in the world.

==== Germany ====
Germany was responsible for manufacturing just under 7% of global scissors exports in 2019. Often called "The City of Blades", Solingen, in North Rhine-Westphalia, has been a center for the manufacturing of scissors since medieval times. At the end of the 18th century it's estimated that there were over 300 scissorsmiths in Solingen.

In 1995 the City of Solingen passed The Solingen Ordinance, an update to a 1930s law that decreed "Made in Solingen" stamps could only be applied to products almost entirely manufactured in the old industrial area of Solingen. In 2019 this applied to approximately 150 companies making high-quality blades of all kinds, including scissors.

Friedrich Herder, founded in Solingen in 1727, is one of the oldest scissors manufacturers still operating in Germany.

==== Italy ====
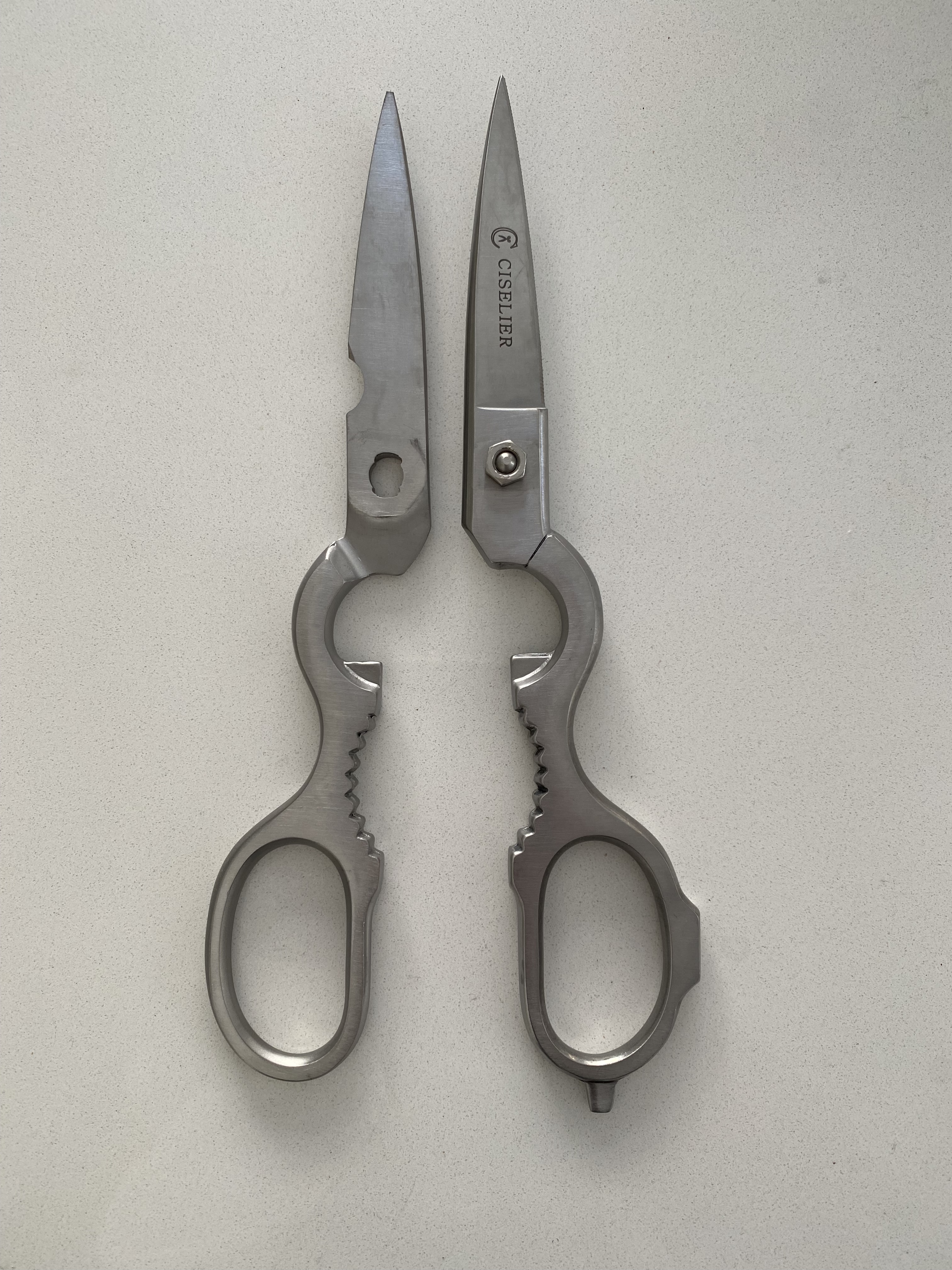
Classic Italian-style kitchen scissors, often used to cut food. The two halves can be detached in order to be cleaned.

Premana, in Lecco Province, has its origins in ironworks and knife manufacturing beginning in the 16th century. In 1900 there were ten scissor manufacturing workshops, 20 in 1952 and 48 by 1960. Today, Consorzio Premax, an industrial partnership, organizes over 60 local companies involved in the manufacture of scissors for global markets. In 2019 Italy exported 3.5% of scissors manufactured globally.

One of the oldest Premanese scissor manufacturing firms still in operation is Sanelli Ambrogio, which was founded in 1869.

==== Japan ====
Scissormaking in Japan evolved from sword making in the 14th century. Seki, in Gifu Prefecture, was a renowned center of swordmaking beginning in the 1200s. After citizens were no longer permitted to carry swords, the city's blacksmiths turned to making scissors and knives. There are many specialized types of Japanese scissors, but sewing scissors were introduced by American Commodore Matthew Perry from the United States in 1854.

The Sasuke workshop in Sakai City south of Osaka is run by Yasuhiro Hirakawa, a 5th generation scissorsmith. The company has been in operation since 1867. Yasuhiro Hirakawa is the last traditional scissormaker in Japan, making scissors in the traditional style where the blades are believed to be thinner, lighter and sharper than European scissors. In 2018 he was profiled in a documentary that featured a pair of his bonsai snips which retailed for US$35,000.

==== Spain ====
In Solsona, Spain, scissor manufacturing began in the 16th century. At the industry's peak in the 18th century there were 24 workshops, organized as the Guild of Saint Eligius, the patron saint of knife makers. By the mid-1980s there were only two, and by 2021, Pallarès Solsona, founded in 1917 by Lluìs and Carles Pallarès Canal, and still family-operated, was the town's sole remaining artisanal scissor manufacturer.

==== United Kingdom ====
Sheffield was home to the first mass production of scissors beginning in 1761. By the 19th century there were an estimated 60 steel scissor companies in Sheffield. However, since the 1980s, industry globalization and a shift towards cheaper, mass-produced scissors created price deflation that many artisanal manufacturers could not compete with. The Sheffield scissor industry consisted of just two local companies in 2021.

The two remaining Sheffield scissor manufacturers are William Whiteley, founded in 1760, and Ernest Wright, which was established in 1902. Both now focus on high-end/niche crafting of "products for life" rather than mass production. Between these two firms it is estimated that there are no more than ten "putter-togetherers" or "putters" who are the master-trained craftspeople responsible for high quality Sheffield scissor assembly. In 2020, Ernest Wright was recognized with the Award for Endangered Crafts by the British Heritage Crafts Association.

== Right-handed and left-handed scissors ==
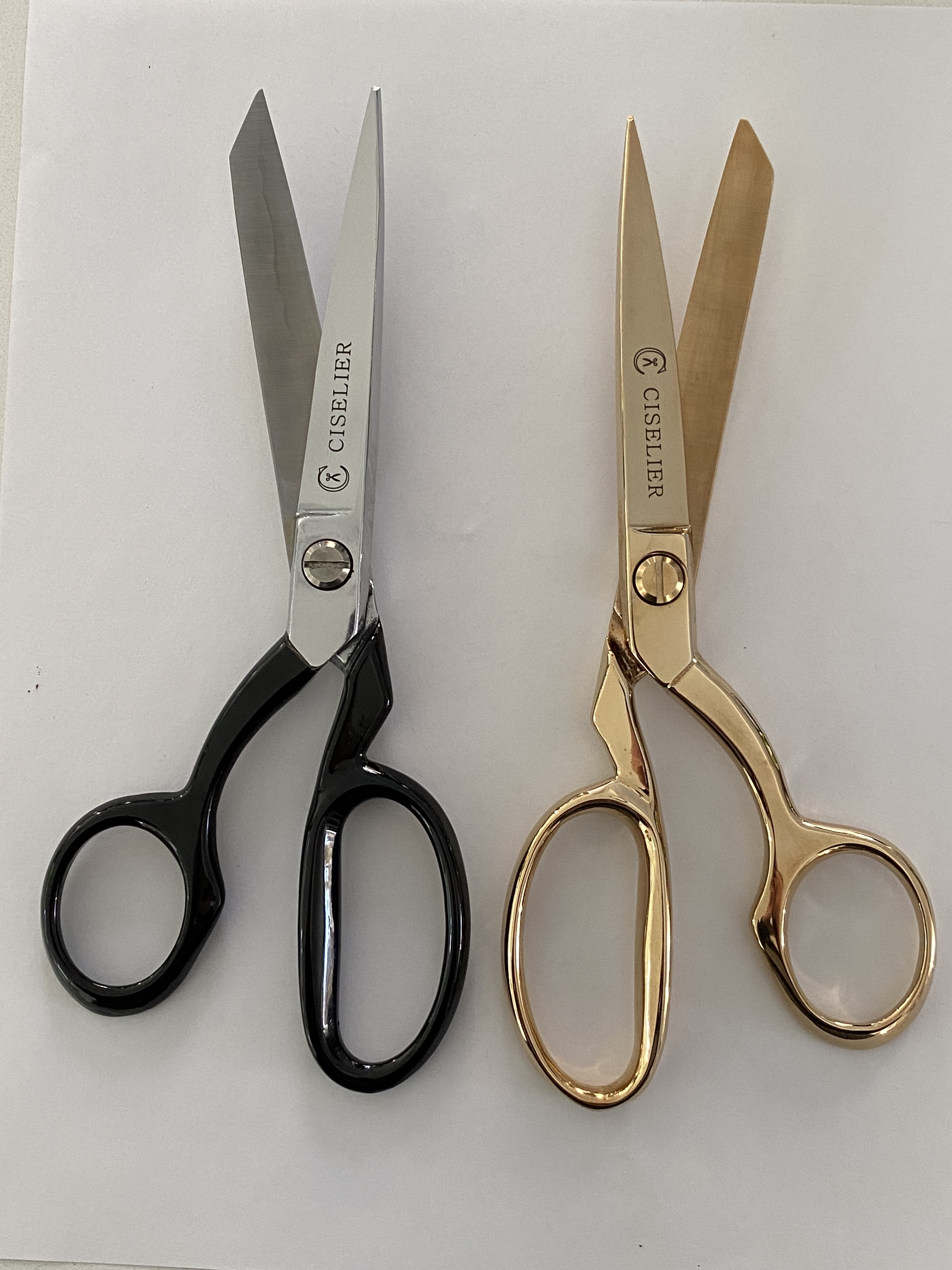
Left-handed (left) and right-handed (right) sidebent scissors

There are two varieties of left-handed scissors. Many common left-handed scissors (often called "semi"-left-handed scissors) simply have reversed finger grips. The blades open and close as with right-handed scissors, so that users tend to pull the blades apart as they are cutting. This can be challenging for craftspeople as the blades still obscure the cut. "True" left-handed scissors have both reversed finger grips and reversed blade layout, like mirror images of right-handed scissors. A left-handed person accustomed to using semi-left handed scissors may find using true left-handed scissors difficult at first, as they may have learned to rely heavily on the strength of their thumb to pull the blades apart vs. pushing the blades together in order to cut.

Some scissors are marketed as ambidextrous. These have symmetric handles so there is no distinction between the thumb and finger handles, and have very strong pivots so that the blades rotate without any lateral give. However, most "ambidextrous" scissors are in fact still right-handed in that the upper blade is on the right, and hence is on the outside when held in the right hand. Even if they cut successfully, the blade orientation will block the view of the cutting line for a left-handed person. True ambidextrous scissors are possible if the blades are double-edged and one handle is swung all the way around (to almost 360 degrees) so that what were the backs of the blades become the new cutting edges. U.S. patent 3,978,584 was awarded for true ambidextrous scissors.

== Specialized scissors and shears ==
Specialized scissors and shears include:

=== Gardening, agriculture and animal husbandry ===
Type	Image	Description/purpose
Hedge trimmers		for trimming hedges
Grass shears		for trimming grass
Averruncators		for trimming high branches
Pruning shears or secateurs		for trimming small branches
Loppers		for cutting through large branches
Blade shears		for cutting an animal's fleece to harvest wool

=== Food and drug ===
Type	Image	Description/purpose
Kitchen scissors or kitchen shears		for food preparation and other purposes
Poultry shears		to cut poultry
Cigar cutter		specialized scissors with concave blade edges to cut cigars

=== Grooming ===
Type	Image	Description/purpose
Hair-cutting shears		for trimming hair
Thinning shears		for thinning thick hair to avoid a bushy look
Hair clippers		used by barbers, hairdressers, and pet groomers for cutting hair
Nail scissors		for cutting nails
Nose scissors		small scissors for nostril and ear hair

=== Metalwork ===
Type	Image	Description/purpose
Tinner snips		for cutting through tin
Compound-action snips		for cutting through aluminium and stainless steel
Pipe and duct snips		for cutting through stove pipe and ducting
Hydraulic cutters		for cutting heavy sheet metal, often in traffic collisions. Sometimes referred to by the genericized trademark "Jaws of Life".
Throatless shear		for cutting complex shapes in sheet metal

=== Medical ===
Type	Image	Description/purpose
Trauma shears, or "tuff cuts"		for use in emergency medical response and rescue to cut off clothing
Dissection scissors		for cutting flesh in dissection
Surgical scissors		for cutting flesh in surgery
Suture scissors		for cutting sutures, the hook lifts the suture
Iris scissors		for ophthalmic surgery
Metzenbaum scissors		for delicate surgery
Tenotomy scissors		for delicate surgery
Mayo scissors		often for cutting fascia
Bandage scissors		for cutting bandages

=== Ceremonial ===
Type	Image	Description/purpose
Ceremonial scissors		giant scissors used for ceremonial ribbon-cutting events

=== Sewing and clothes-making ===
Type	Image	Description/purpose
Crafting scissors		for cutting materials for crafts
Buttonhole scissors		for opening buttonholes
Dressmaker's shears		for cutting fabric for dressmaking
Embroidery scissors		for cutting fabric for embroidery
Pinking shears		for cutting cloth leaving a sawtooth edge
Tailor's scissors		for cutting through heavy-duty materials such as leather or multiple layers of fabric

=== Primary education ===
Type	Image	Description/purpose
Safety scissors		for children to learn and practice how to use scissors; tips are blunt to reduce injury risk; small size, for children's hands

== Gallery ==
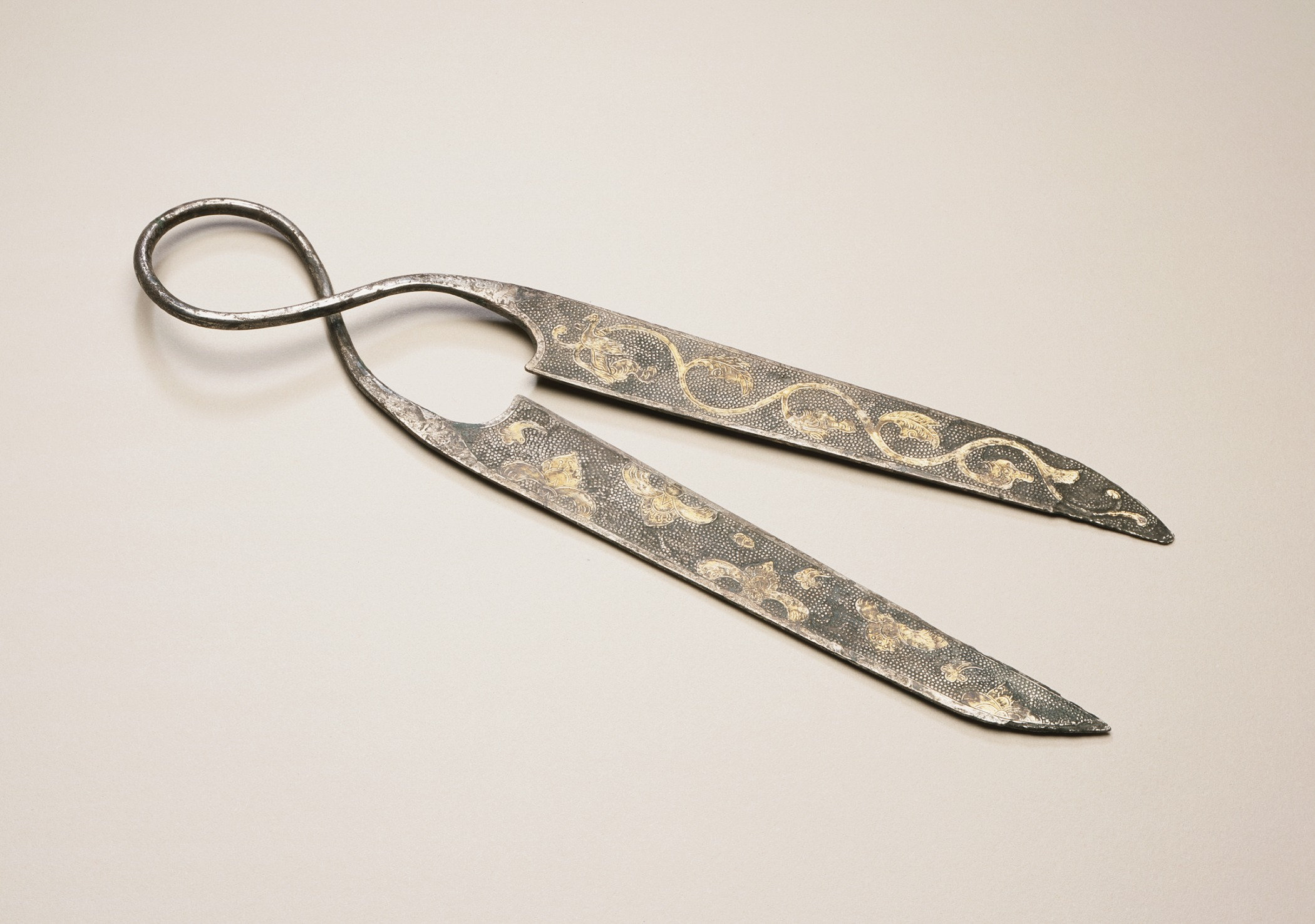
Chinese scissors, early to mid-Tang dynasty

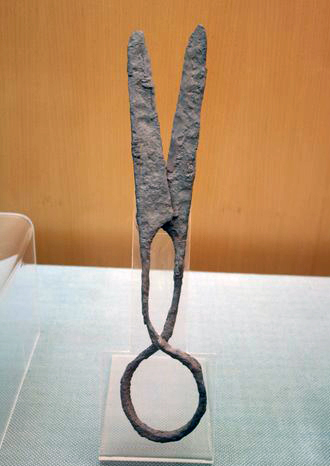
A pair of iron scissors dating from the Han dynasty

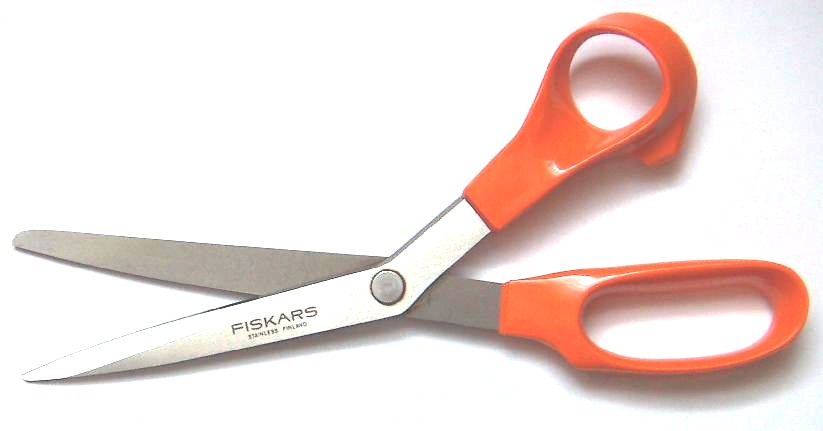
Fiskars scissors from 1967

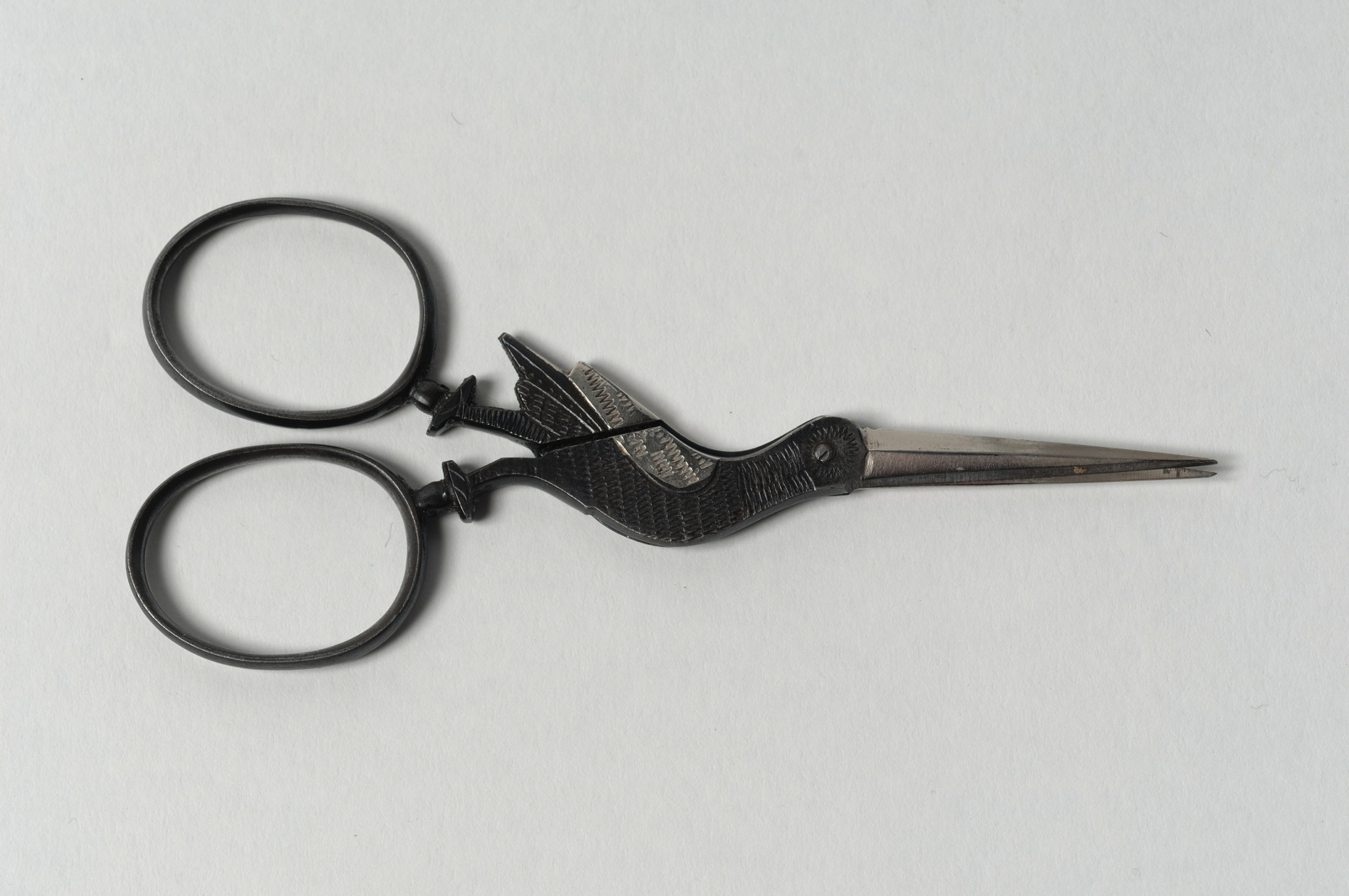
Embroidery scissors in the form of a crane

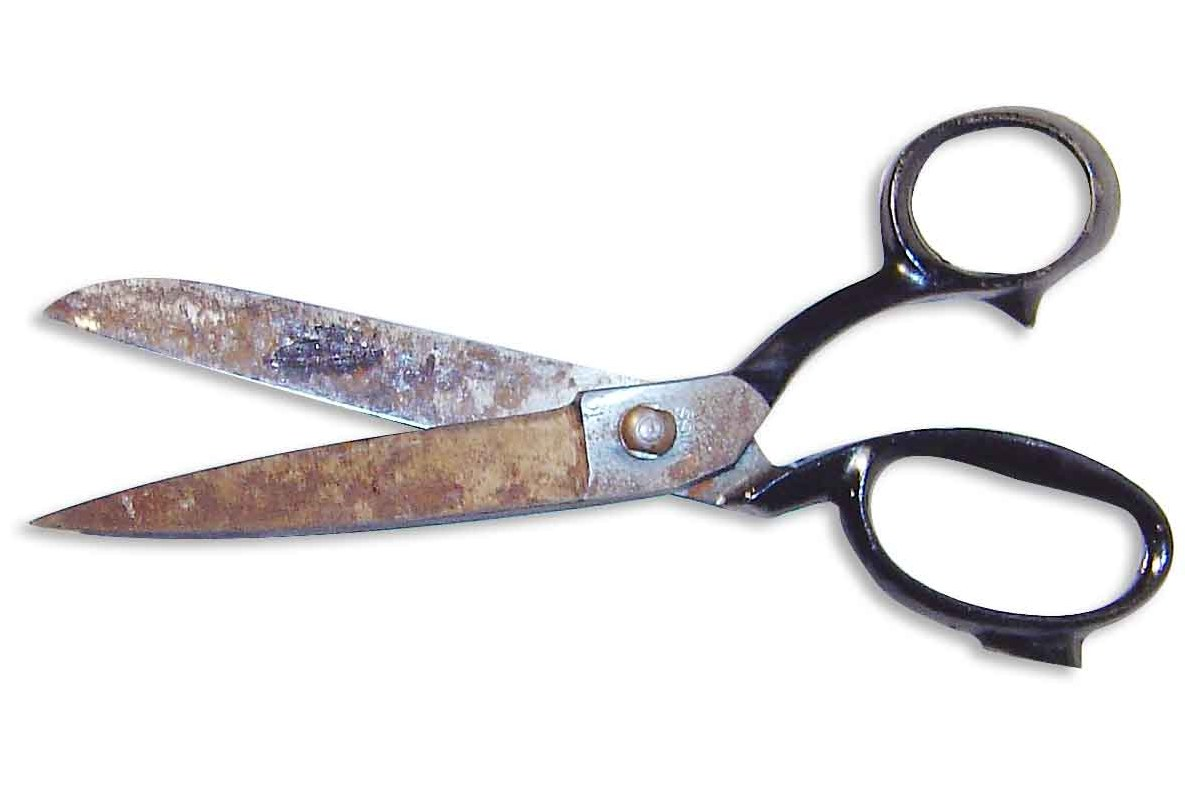
A pair of shears

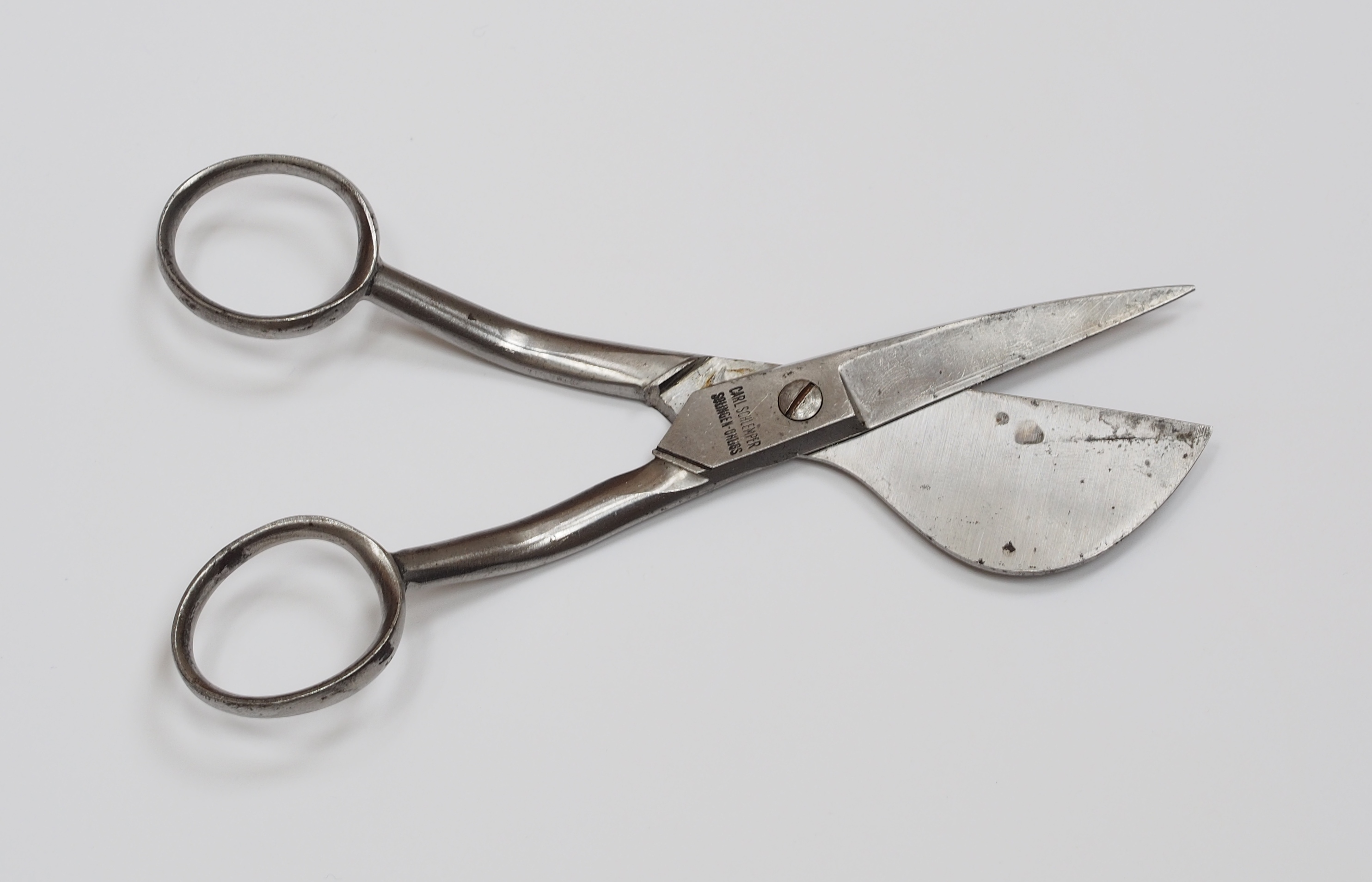
Scissors for cutting carpet pile

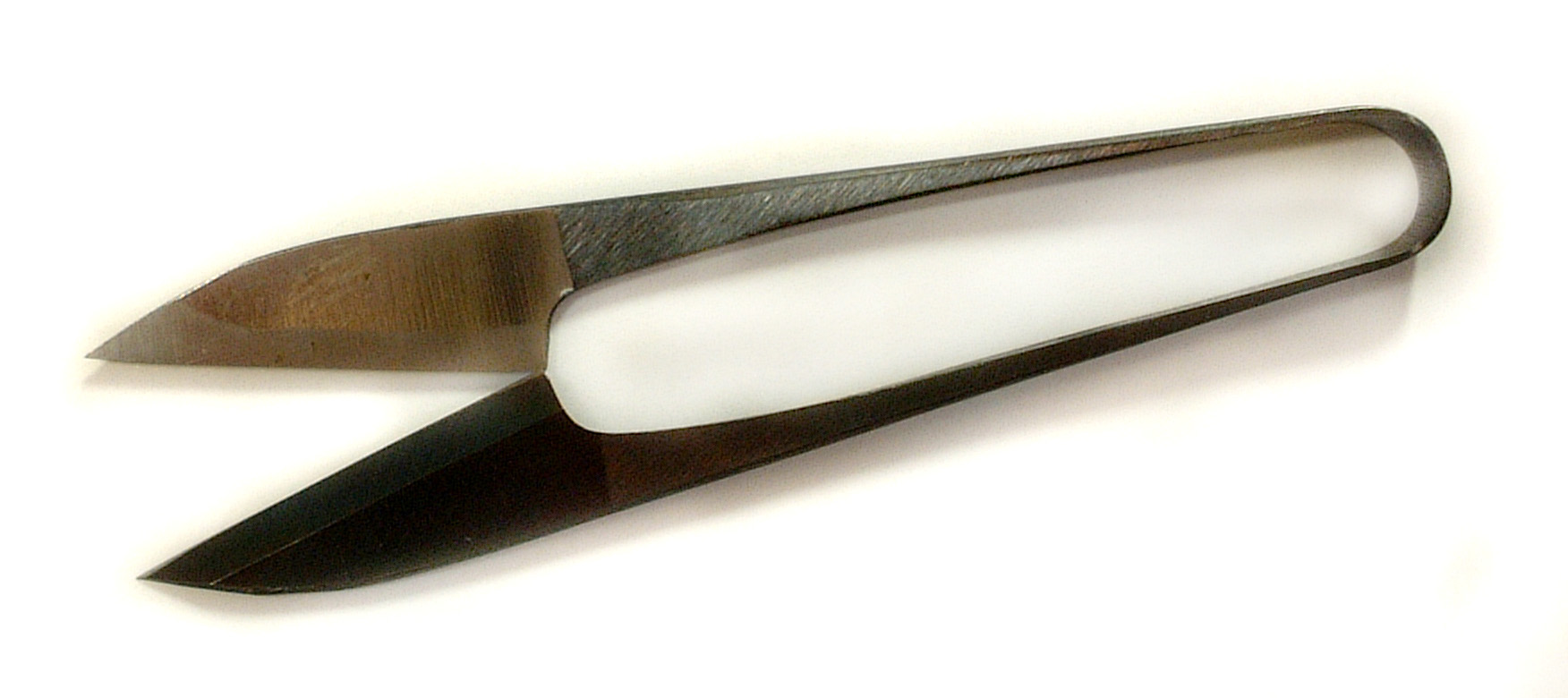
These scissors are used in Japan to cut threads in sewing.

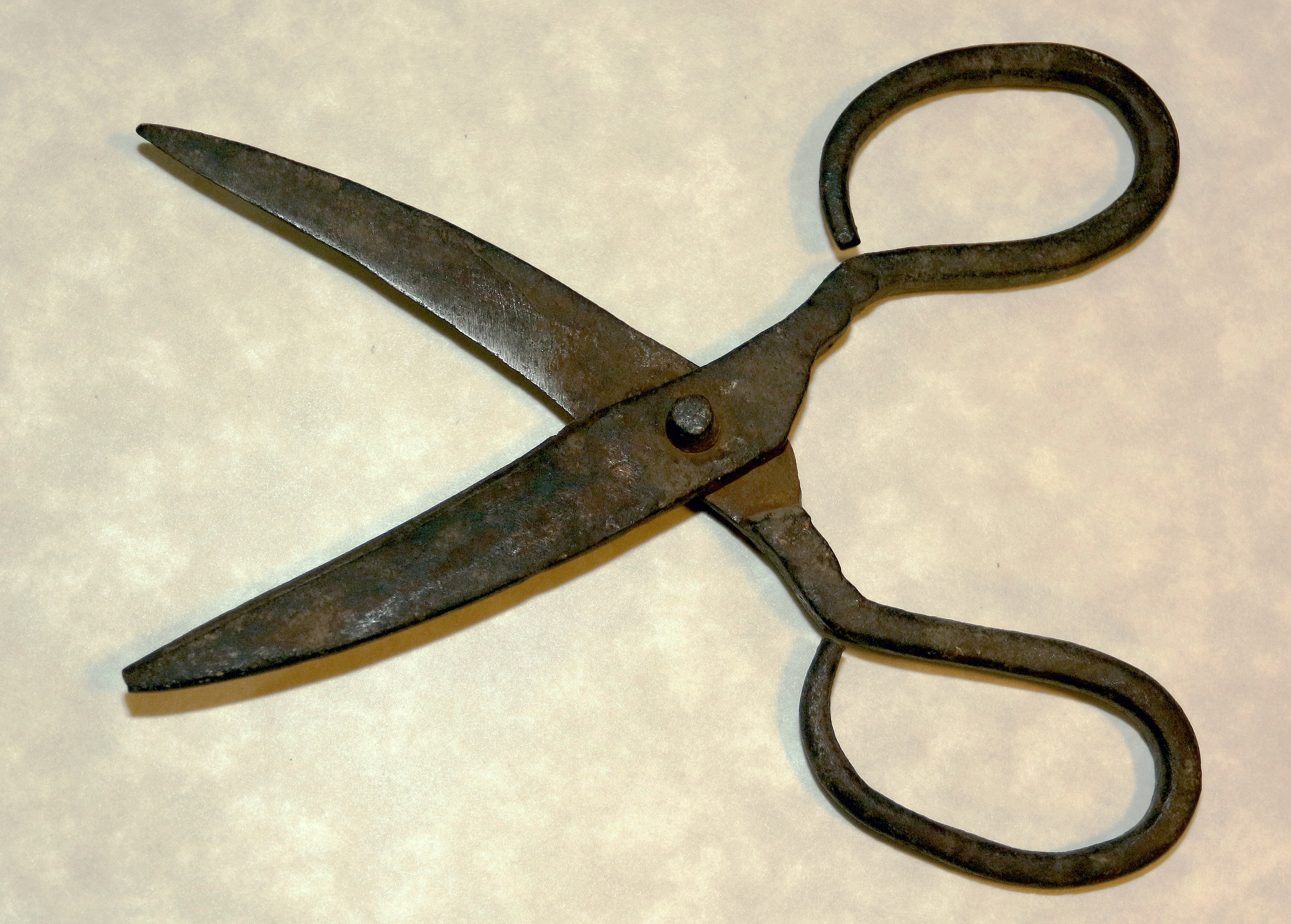
Scissors, pre-1850s iron from Norway, used to cut cloth

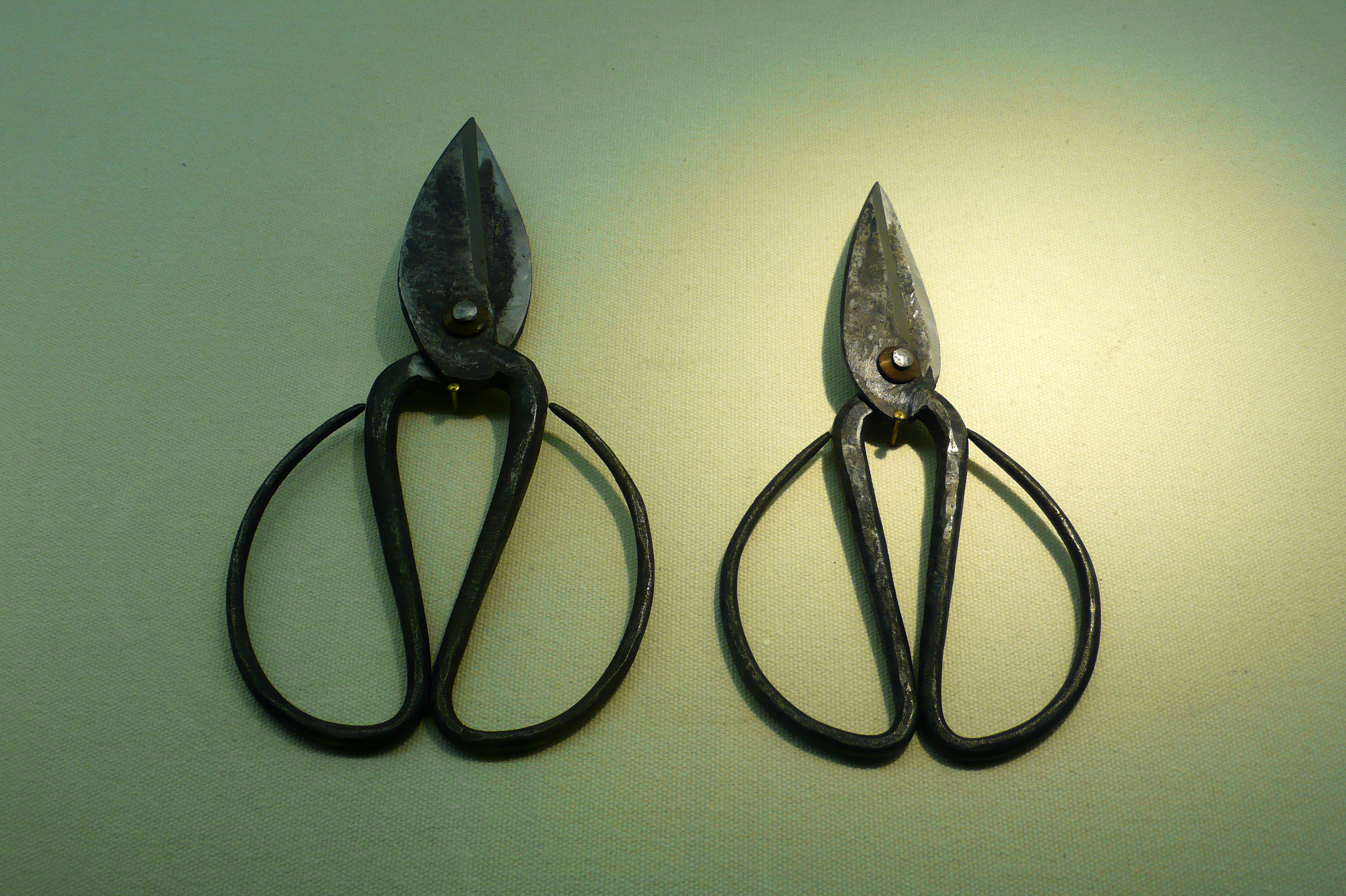
Chinese-style scissors seen in a Hangzhou museum

== See also ==
- Hemostat resembles a pair of scissors, but is used as a clamp in surgery and does not cut at all.
- Nippers cut (break) small pieces out of tile.
- Pliers used for holding and crimping metal or wire.
- Tijeras Canyon a geological feature in New Mexico, US and Tijeras a village in the same canyon, after "scissors" in Spanish.
