= Surgical instrument =

Tools designed for use during surgery

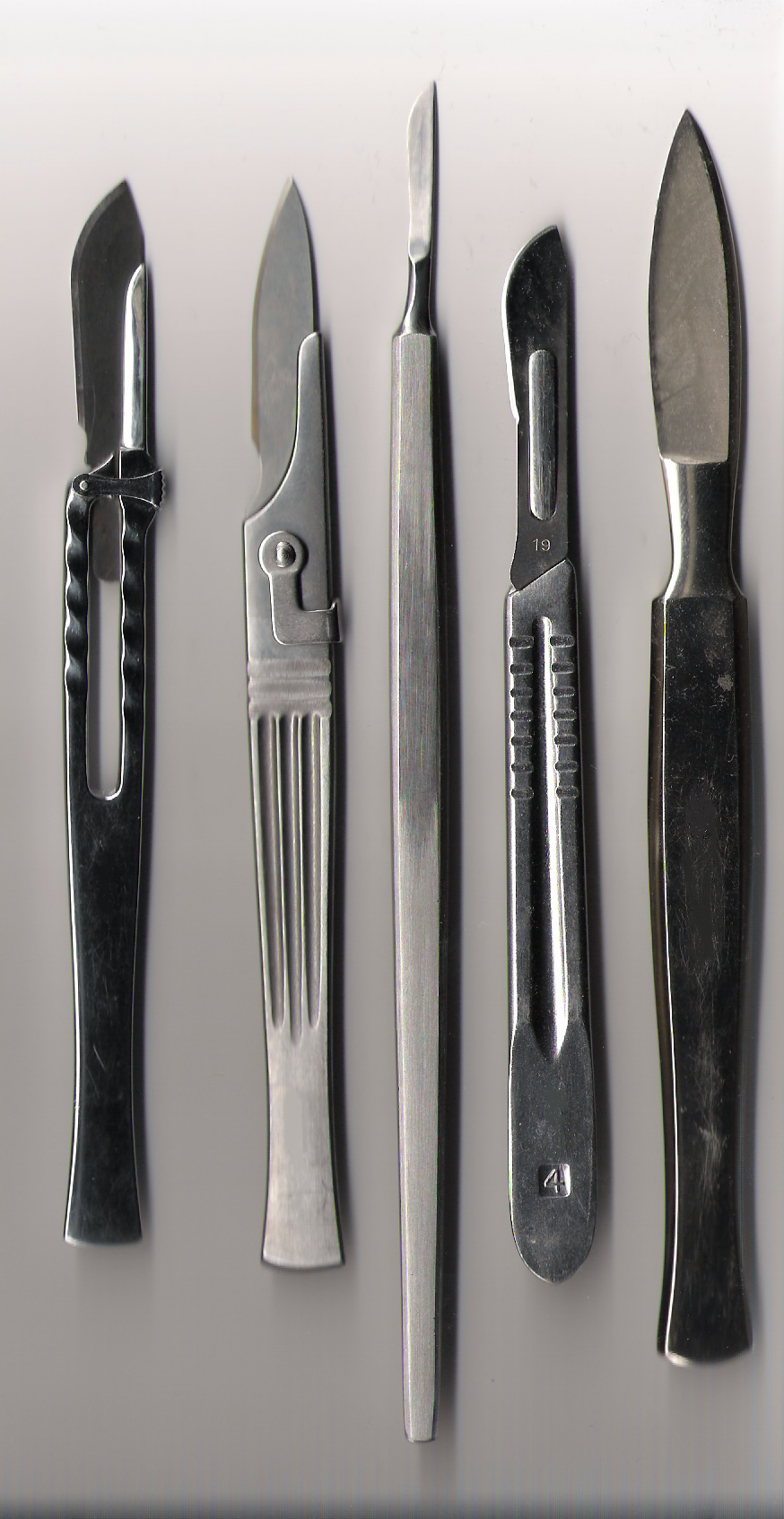
Various scalpels

A surgical instrument is a medical device used during surgery to perform specific actions, such as cutting, modifying tissue, or providing access for viewing. Over time, a broad spectrum of tools has been developed—some for general surgical use, others tailored to specialized procedures.

Classification systems help surgeons understand an instrument's function and appropriate usage. Innovation continues to drive the development of more precise, safer, and more effective instruments for modern surgery.

Reusable surgical instruments typically undergo sterile processing between uses combining cleaning, inspection, packaging and, where required, sterilization, to reduce or eliminate the risk of surgical site infection.

== History ==
Surgical instruments have evolved alongside advances in medical science and surgical technique. Early tools were often adapted from everyday implements but were later refined for better precision and safety.

Two key milestones shaped modern surgical tools:

In the early 20th century, the advancement from antiseptic to aseptic surgery led to widespread adoption of sterilizers, sterile gauze, and cotton. Instrument handles transitioned from wood or ivory to metal, enabling effective sterilization. Simpler, one-piece designs improved safety and usability.

During World War II, hand surgery emerged as a subspecialty. Many of the tools developed for this purpose are still in use today, often named after their innovators.

Individual tools have diverse history development. Below is a brief history of the inventors and tools created for five commonly used surgical tools.

=== Scissors ===
- Mayo scissors, developed by one of the Mayo brothers in the late 19th century, feature semi-blunt ends and either straight or curved blades—the former for superficial tissues, the latter for thicker tissue.
- Metzenbaum scissors, designed by Myron Metzenbaum, are characterized by lighter construction and longer handles, suitable for delicate procedures like tonsillectomy (the surgical removal of the tonsils).

=== Knife to scalpel to electrocautery ===
- Early cutting tools were rudimentary, made from materials like sharpened leaves or bamboo. Later, scalpels were developed in medieval Muslim and European medical traditions.
- In 1904, King Gillette introduced a safety razor with disposable blades. A decade later, Morgan Parker patented a disposable scalpel blade that locked onto a metal handle—offering both durability and sterility.
- Though cautery techniques existed since antiquity, electrical cautery (diathermy) became practical in the 18th century. William Stewart Halsted pioneered the technique, which would later evolve into modern cautery.
- In 1900, physician Joseph Rivière used electricity to treat a malignant hand ulcer. In 1907, Karl Franz Nagelschmidt applied diathermy to tumors and hemorrhoids.
- William T. Bovie, working with Dr. Harvey Cushing, developed a device capable of cutting and coagulating tissue simultaneously, laying the foundation for modern electrosurgery.

=== Retractors ===
- Before modern retractors, surgeons often used their fingers to hold tissues aside. Around 1000 AD, Albucasis described specialized hooks for procedures like circumcision and tracheostomy.
- In the 19th century, Eugène-Louis Doyen introduced self-retaining abdominal retractors to improve surgical exposure in gynecological and abdominal operations.
- Nicholas Senn, an advocate of antiseptic technique, created a retractor with a smooth surface and a double-ended design intended to reduce infection.
- In 1905, Franz Weitlaner developed a self-retaining finger-ring retractor with a cam lock, enabling single-handed use—its design inspired many modern variants like Adson-Beckman and Chung retractors.

=== Forceps ===
- Back in the 6th century BC, laboring caused a high mortality rate for both mothers and newborns due to the hours or days of the lasting delivery process. This problem led to the establishment of forceps-assisted delivery in the 16th century by the Chamberlen family. Forceps were later developed over several centuries by leading obstetricians of the time including James Simpson, Neville Barnes, and Christian Kielland.
- Michael Ellis DeBakey invented one of the most common and well-known DeBakey forceps. The vascular atraumatic forceps (DeBakey) were widely used for grasping vascular tissue and causing minimal damage to the vessels. This invention led to the development of the Dacron aortic graft for the repair of aortic aneurysms.
- Around the mid-1900s, Alfred Washington Adson, a pioneer in neuroscience at Mayo Clinic, invented Adson forceps that allows the lifting and removal of neural tissue.

=== Hemostat/clamp ===
- Hemostats are forceps that aim to obliterate the lumen of vessels and to obtain adherence to the crushed surfaces and vascular hemostasis. Originally, this notion of crushing did not exist and arterial catch forceps simply clamped vessels temporarily prior to ligature or cautery.
- In 1867, Eugene Koeberle, who accidentally found arterial forceps with a catch closure came away spontaneously without the need for ligature, and invented “pince hémostatique,” which have pin and hole catches.
- In 1882, the Kocher clamp was created by Emil Theodor Kocher, who significantly contributed to thyroidectomies (removal of all or a part of the thyroid gland) and decompressive craniotomy. This invention decreases the risk of contamination while cutting dense tissue.
- Later, Dr. William Henry Welch and William Stewart Halsted contributed to the invention of clamps and Halsted-Mosquito Hemostats, which were used to clamp small blood vessels. Kelly clamp, invented by Howard Kelly, has similar functions but it can clamp larger vessels due to the slightly larger jaw.

Accordingly, the nomenclature of surgical instruments follows certain patterns, such as a description of the action it performs (for example, scalpel, hemostat), the name of its inventor(s) (for example, the Kocher forceps), or a compound scientific name related to the kind of surgery (for example, a tracheotomy is a tool used to perform a tracheotomy).

== Classification ==
There are several classes of surgical instruments:

- Graspers, such as forceps (non-locking forceps/ grasping forceps, thumb forceps, pick-ups)
  - Used for tissue or object grasping. Forceps are categorized into toothed or non-toothed at the tip. (e.g., Tissue forceps, Adson forceps, Bonney forceps, DeBakey forceps, Russian forceps)
- Clamps (locking forceps)
  - Clamps stabilize or hold tissue and objects in place. They can be used for traumatic or atraumatic purposes. (e.g., Crile hemostat, Kelly clamp, Kocher clamp)
- Surgical scissors
  - Tool for tissue cutting, dissection, and suture. Straight and curved scissors are used for cutting different structures. (e.g., Mayo scissors, Metzenbaum scissors, Pott's scissors, Iris Scissors).
- Bone cutters: unpowered or powered saws, drills and pliers-like devices
- Needles/sutures
  - Tools used for suturing dissection sites or closing cuts. Needles have different shapes (e.g. j shape, ½ circle, straight) and cutting edges (tapered - round, conventional cutting - triangular) depending on the application and areas of the suture. Sutures can be categorized based on different sizes (e.g., #5-#11, higher numbers represent larger suture diameter) and types (absorbable and nonabsorbable and braided and non-braided) as well.
- Needle drivers (needle holders)
  - Tools used to hold suture needle while it is passed through tissue and to grasp suture while instrument knot tying.
- Retractors, used to spread open skin, ribs and other tissue
  - Tools for various purposes depending on the condition. Retractors can be used to expose incision openings, hold tissue back, or maintain operating areas. They can be categorized into either hand-held retractors or self-retaining ones (via a ratcheting mechanism) (e.g., Deaver retractor, Weitlaner retractor, malleable retractor).
- Distractors, positioners and stereotactic devices
- Mechanical cutters (scalpels, lancets, trocars, rongeurs, etc.)
- Dilators and specula, for access to narrow passages or incisions
- Suction tips and tubes, for removal of bodily fluids
  - Tools used to remove secretion, debris, or any fluid in the surgical area. (e.g., Yankauer suction tube, Poole suction tube, Frazier suction tip)
- Sealing devices
  - Surgical clips, used to permanently clamp/close off small hollow structures such as blood vessels and ducts
  - Surgical staples, used to close skin wounds or for resection (removing part of an organ), transection (cutting through organs and tissues) and anastomoses (creating connections between structures)
  - Tools used to help with atypical suturing, e.g., purse string suture applicators
- Irrigation and injection needles, tips and tubes, for introducing fluid
- Powered devices, such as cranial drills and dermatomes
- Scopes and probes, including fiber optic endoscopes and tactile probes
- Carriers and appliers for optical, electronic, and mechanical devices
- Ultrasound tissue disruptors, cryotomes and cutting laser guides
- Measurement devices, such as rulers, calipers and depth gauges
- Energy devices are used to cut tissues and/or seal vessels via ablation, i.e. vaporization of cells(
  - Electrosurgery or diathermy is a modern technology that uses high frequency electrical current to fulgurate or "cut" tissue or coagulate blood.
    - LigaSure is a bipolar electrocautery device marketed by Medtronic that can fuse vessels up to 7mm in diameter in an efficient manner.
  - Argon plasma coagulation involves the application of gas discharges in argon.
  - Ultrasound surgery uses high-frequency and high-energy ultrasound wave devices (e.g., harmonic scalpel) to target and destroy tissue.

== Terminology ==
The expression surgical instrumentation is somewhat interchangeably used with surgical instruments, but its meaning in medical jargon is the activity of providing assistance to a surgeon with the proper handling of surgical instruments during an operation, by a specialized professional, usually a surgical technologist or sometimes a nurse or radiographer.

An important relative distinction regarding surgical instruments is the amount of bodily disruption or tissue trauma that their use might cause the patient. Terms relating to this issue are 'atraumatic' and minimally invasive.

== See also ==
- Instruments used in general surgery
- Medical instruments and implants

== Gallery ==
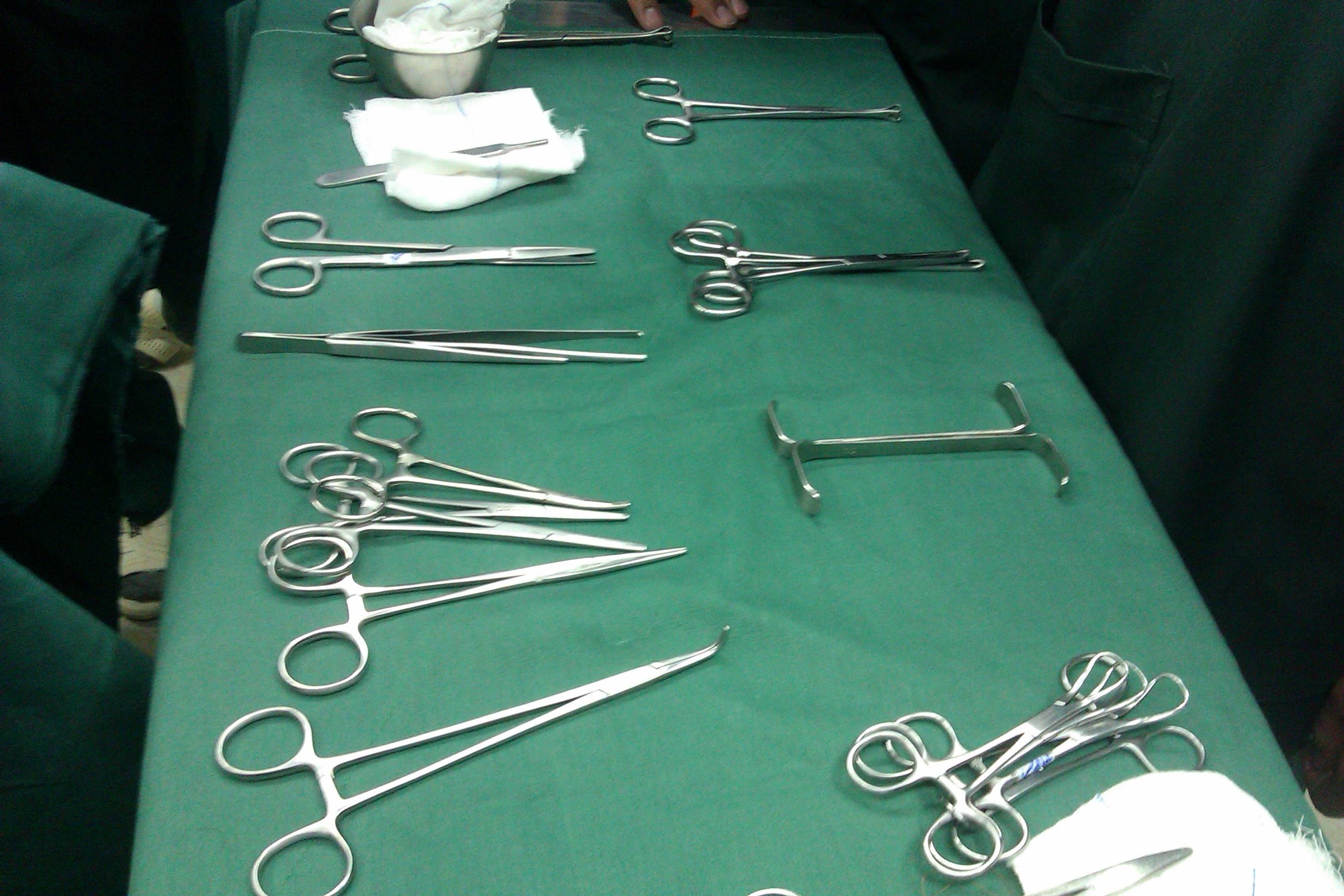

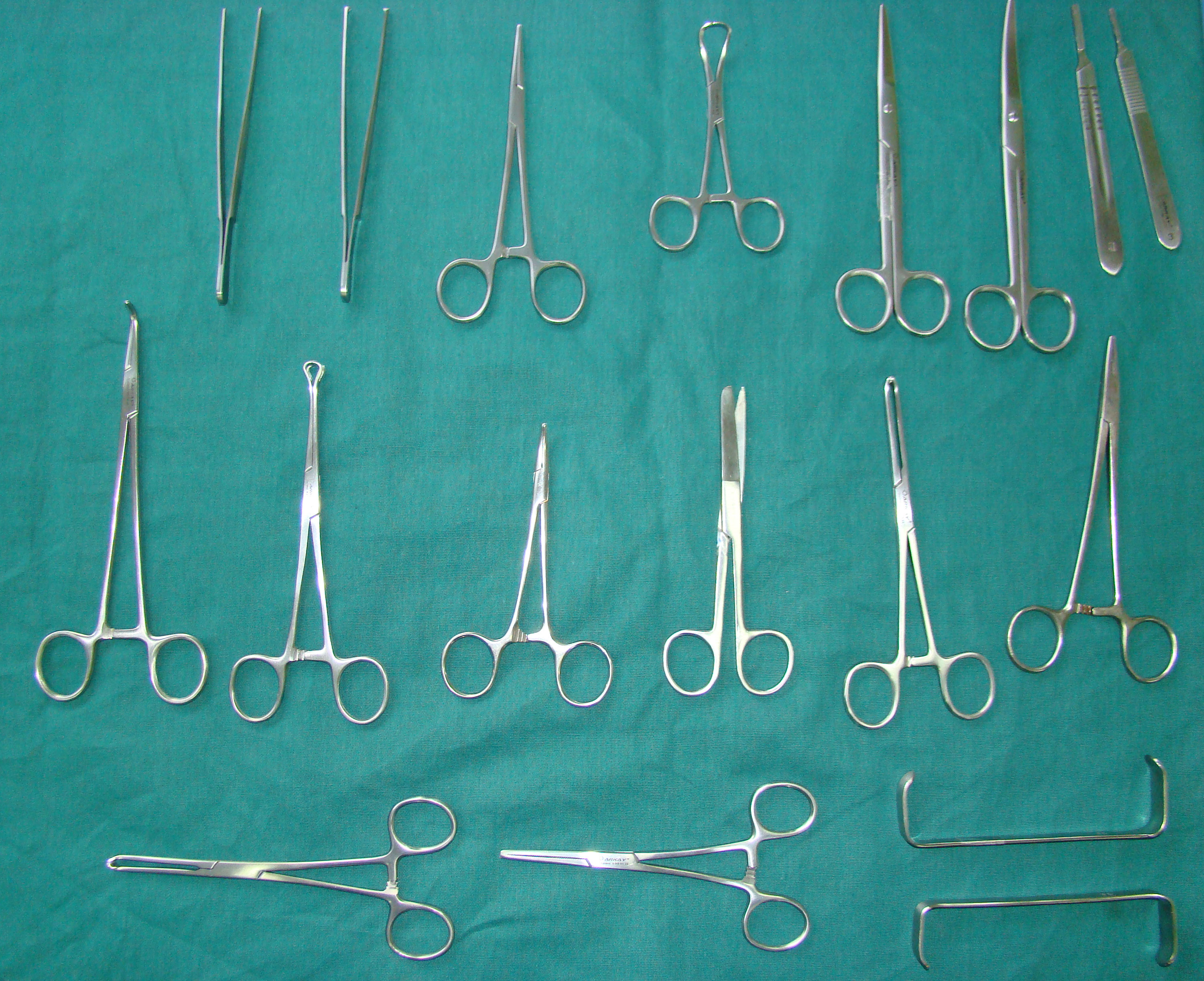

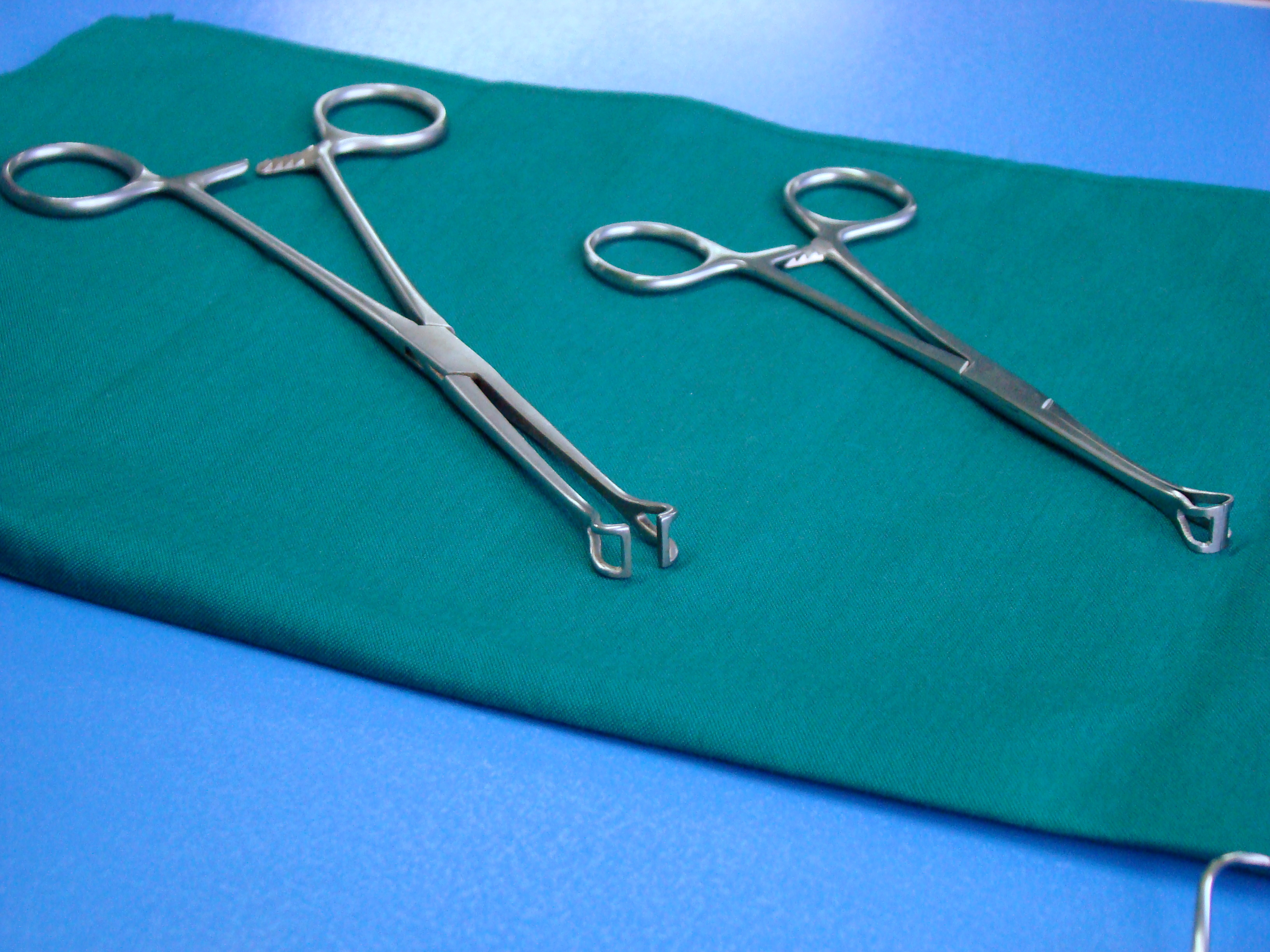

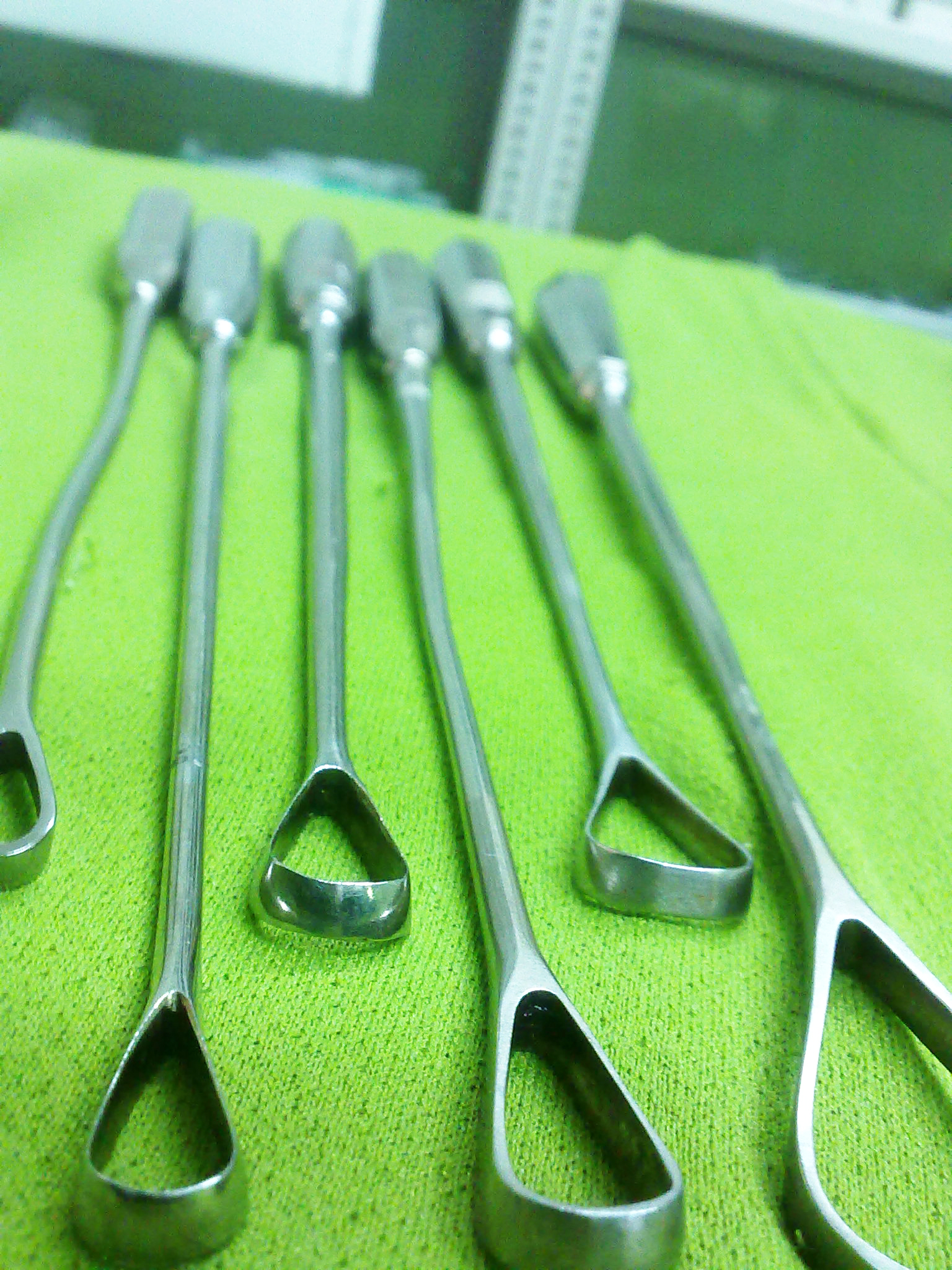

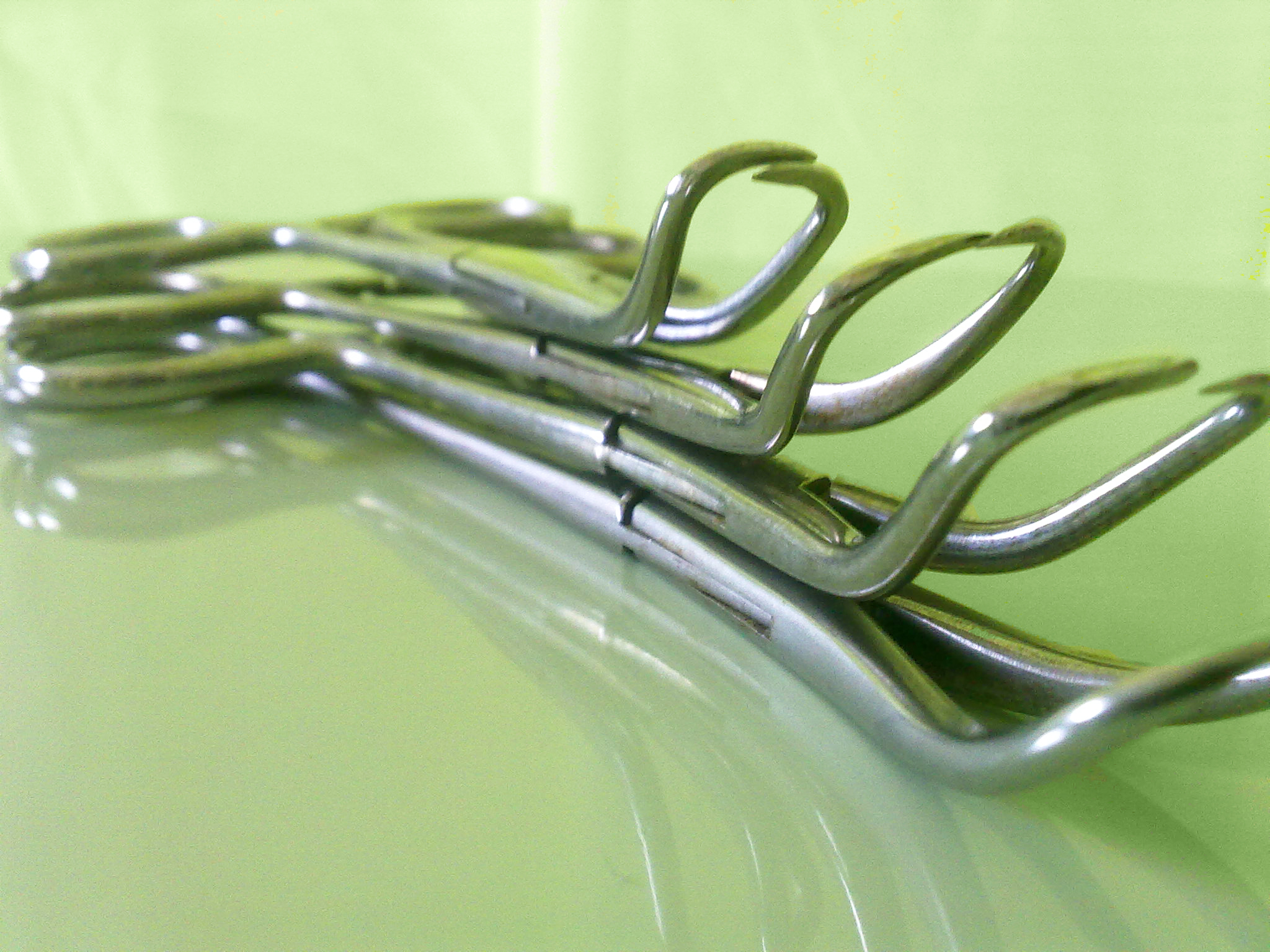

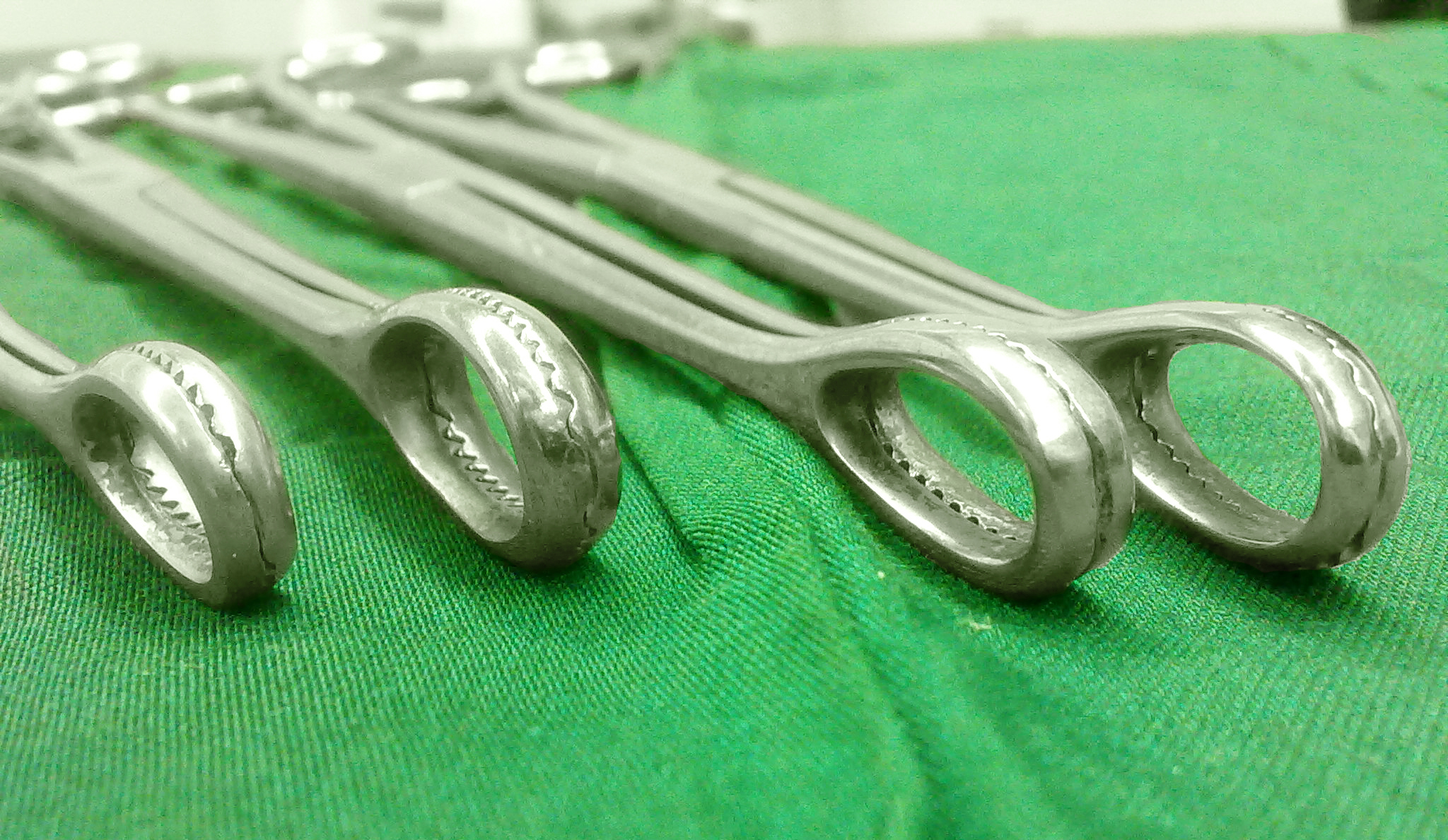

== Bibliography ==
- Wells, MP, Bradley, M: Surgical Instruments A Pocket Guide. W.B. Saunders, 1998.
