= Instruments used in general surgery =

There are many different surgical specialties, some of which require specific kinds of surgical instruments to perform.

General surgery is a specialty focused on the abdomen; the thyroid gland; diseases involving skin, breasts, and various soft tissues; trauma; peripheral vascular disease; hernias; and endoscopic procedures.

Instruments can be classified in many ways, but, broadly speaking, there are five types of instruments:

1. Cutting and dissecting instruments
2. Grasping or holding instruments
3. Hemostatic instruments
4. Retractors
5. Tissue unifying instruments and materials

Instruments used in surgery are:

Instrument Name	Image	Brief description	Specific instruments
Electrical cautery		Electrical surgical cauterization utilizes electricity in either a monopolar or bipolar format to burn soft tissue and control bleeding	Bovie pencil; Monopolar hook; Monopolar spatula; Bipolar forceps
Curette		For scraping or debriding biological tissue or debris in a biopsy, excision, or cleaning procedure	
Dermatome		Removes epidermis to graft over another area	
Dissecting forceps		Grasping and holding; usually used in skin closures or small wounds	Adson
Tissue forceps		Grasping and holding tissue	Allis
Penetrating towel clamp		Used to secure towels or reduce bone fragments	Backhaus penetrating towel clamp
Carmalt forceps		Hemostatic forceps	Kalabasa
Cushing forceps		Grasping and holding	Non-toothed dissecting forceps
Dandy forceps		Hemostatic forceps	
DeBakey forceps		Grasping and holding	Non-toothed dissecting forceps designed for use on blood vessels, organs, or delicate tissue
Doyen intestinal clamp		Clamps and distractors	Non-crushing clamp designed for use on the intestines
Kelly forceps		Hemostatic forceps	
Kocher forceps		Hemostatic forceps	
Mosquito forceps		Hemostatic forceps	
Hook		Retractor	
Nerve hook		Retractor	
Skin hook		Retractor	
Lancet (scalpel)		Cutting	
Mammotome			
Needle holder		Grasping and holding	Castroviejo; Crilewood; Mayo-Hegar; Olsen-Hegar
Retractor		Retractor	Handheld: Deaver; Army-Navy; Richardson; Richardson-Eastmann; Ribbon; Self-retaining: Weitlaner; O'Connor-O'Sullivan; Thompson; Omni-Tract
Ultrasonic scalpel		Cutting	
Laser scalpel		Cutting	
Scissors		Cutting and spreading	May be curved or straight: Iris; Metzenbaum's; Mayo; Tenotomy
Speculum		Used to retract orifices	Graves'; Sim's
Suction tube and Yankeur suction tip		Accessories and implants	
Surgical elevator			
Surgical hook		Retractor	
Surgical blade #15		Used to cut vessels or make small incisions	
Surgical mesh		Accessories and implants	
Surgical needle		Accessories and implants	
Surgical sponge			
GIA stapler		Used to make a gastrointestinal anastamosis	Linear stapler
Surgical tray			
Suture			
Tongue depressor			
Tonsillotome			
Towel clamp		Clamp	
Towel forceps		Clamp	
Backhaus towel forceps			
Lorna towel clamp		Non-penatrating towel clamp	
Tracheotome			
Tissue expander		Accessories and implant	
Subcutaneous inflatable balloon expander		Accessories and implants	
Trephine		Cutting instrument	
Trocar		Access instrument. Used to create an opening into a space without opening the abdominal cavity. A camera is inserted through one to view the interior while instruments are inserted through the others to manipulate the organs.	
Ultrasonic energy device		Surgical device typically used to dissect tissue, but also seals small vessels and tissue bundles	
