= Surgical scissors =

General term for scissors used in surgery or operation

Surgical scissors are scissors that are specially designed as surgical instruments, typically used for delicate cutting of biological tissues, sutures, dressings and other items such as meshes and drains, as well as for use as a blunt dissection tool. Surgical scissors are usually made of surgical stainless steel, and some have tungsten carbide inserts along their blades, the hardness of which allows manufacturers to create sharper and more durable edges.

== Mechanical types of scissors ==
There are two main mechanical types of scissors used in surgery:

- Ring scissors, which look and function much like standard utility scissors with ring finger loops
- Spring forceps are small scissors used mostly in eye surgery or microsurgery. The handles end in flat springs connected with a pivot joint. The cutting action is achieved by pressing the handles together. As the pressure is released, the spring action opens the jaws.

Scissors are available in various tip configurations like

- Blunt/blunt tips (e.g. Mayo scissors, Metzenbaum scissors, Ferguson scissors, bandage scissors)
- Blunt/sharp tips (e.g. suture/nurse's scissors)
- Sharp/sharp tips (e.g. tenotomy scissors, iris scissors, Potts Smith scissors)

== Examples ==
Some examples of surgical scissors include:

- Bandage scissors
- Dissecting scissors
- Iris scissors
- Suture scissors
- Tenotomy scissors
- Metzenbaum scissors
- Plastic surgery (facelift) scissors
- Mayo scissors

== Gallery ==
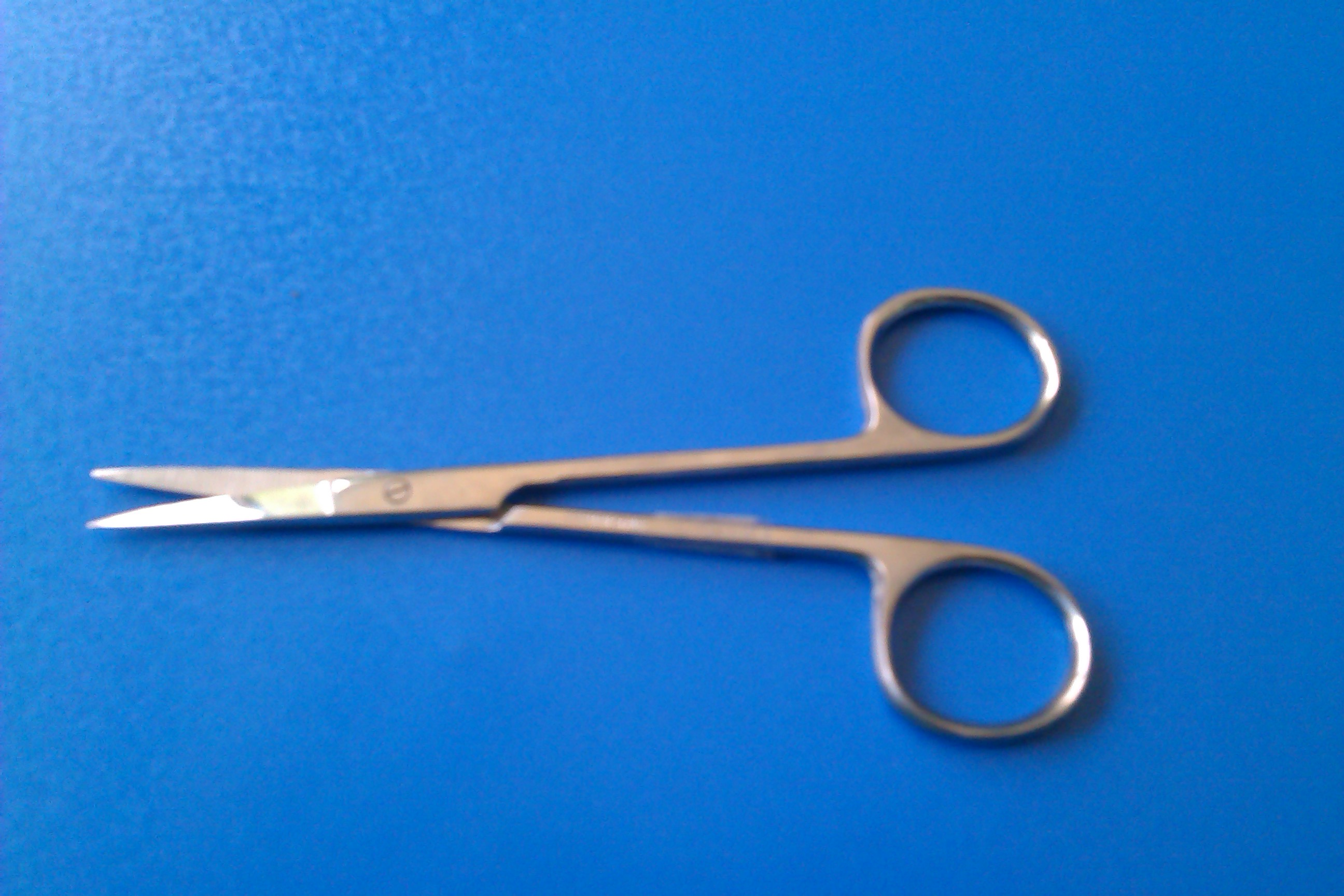
Metzenbaum scissors

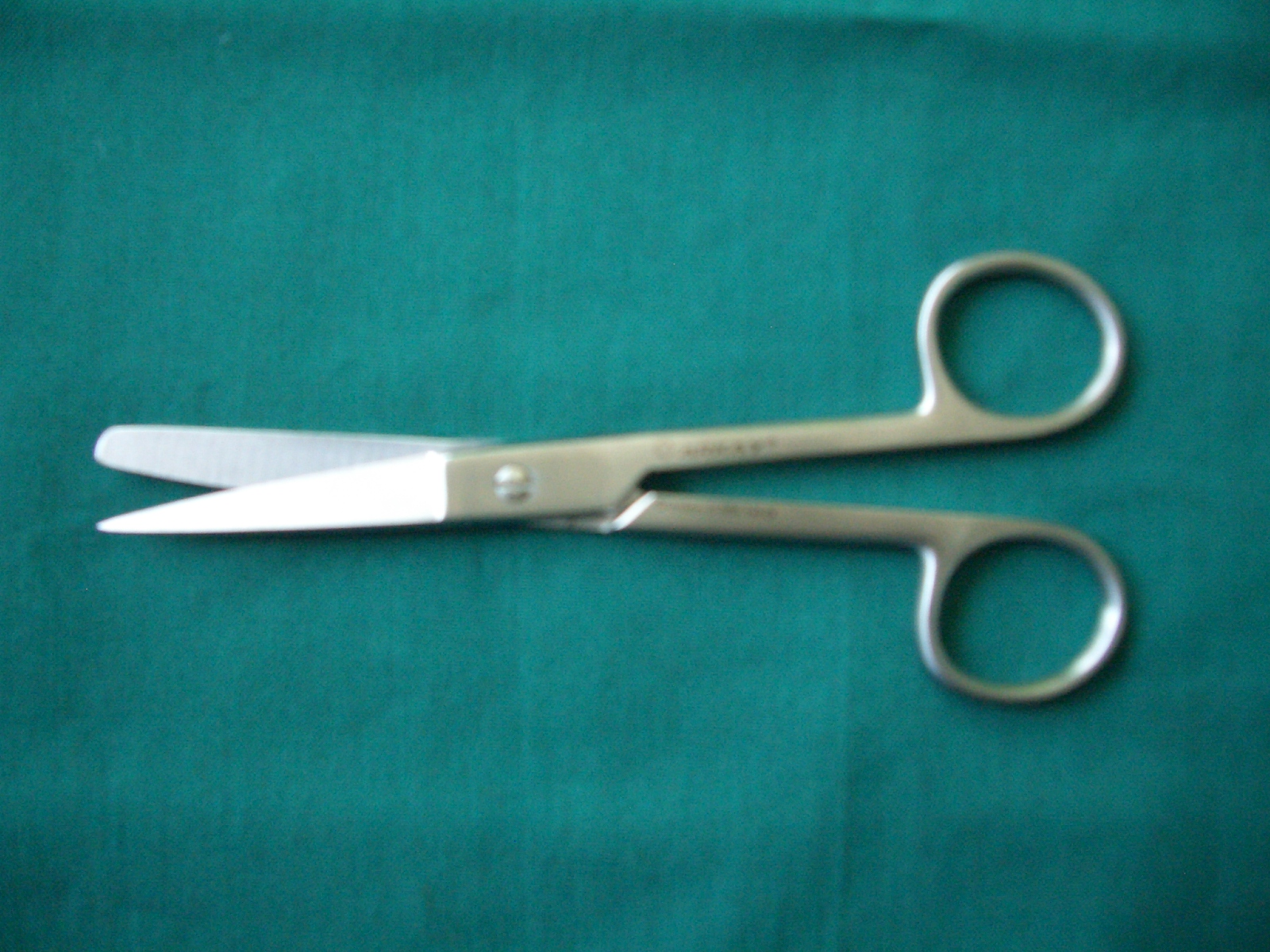
Mayo scissors

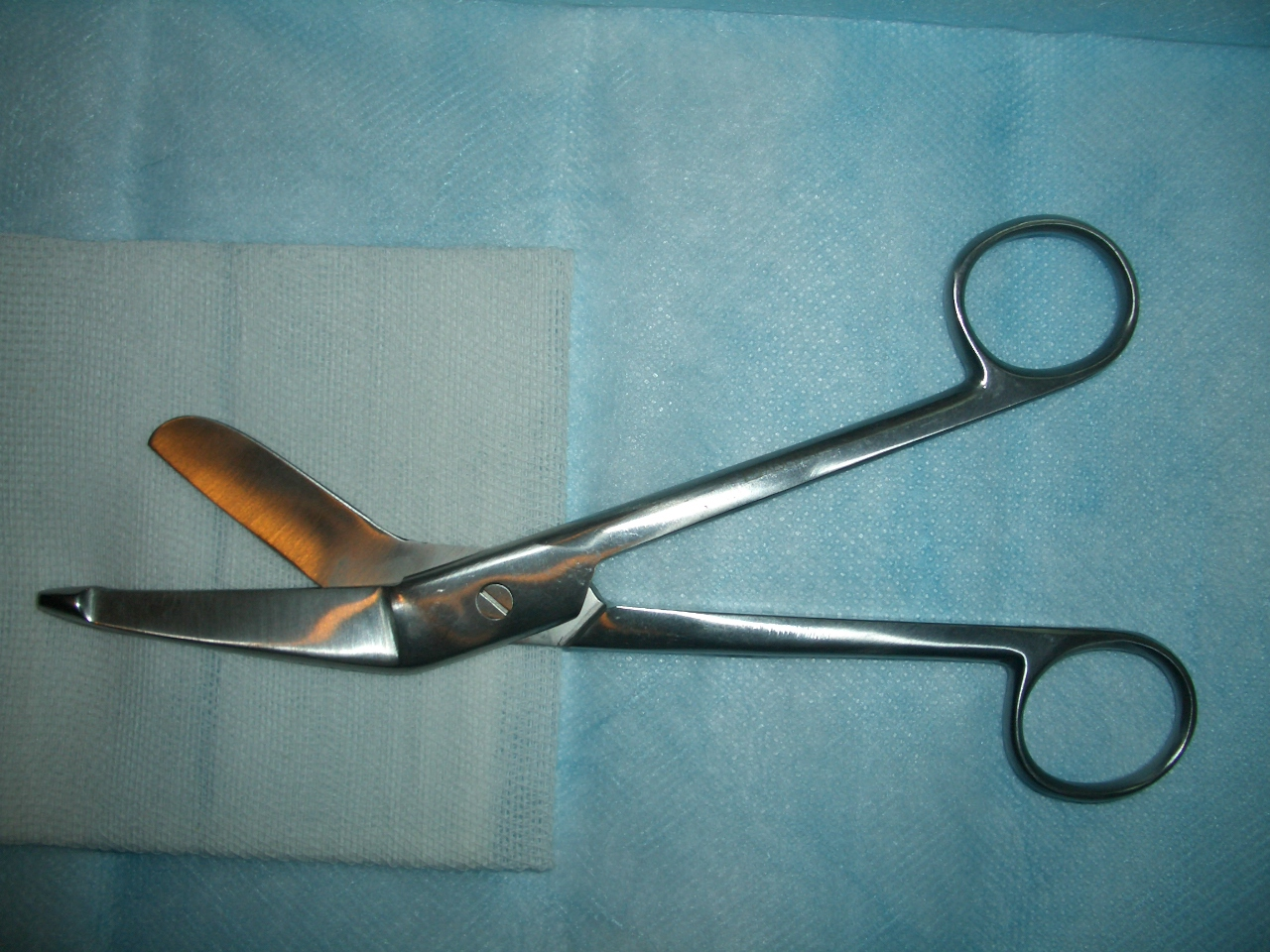
Bandage scissors

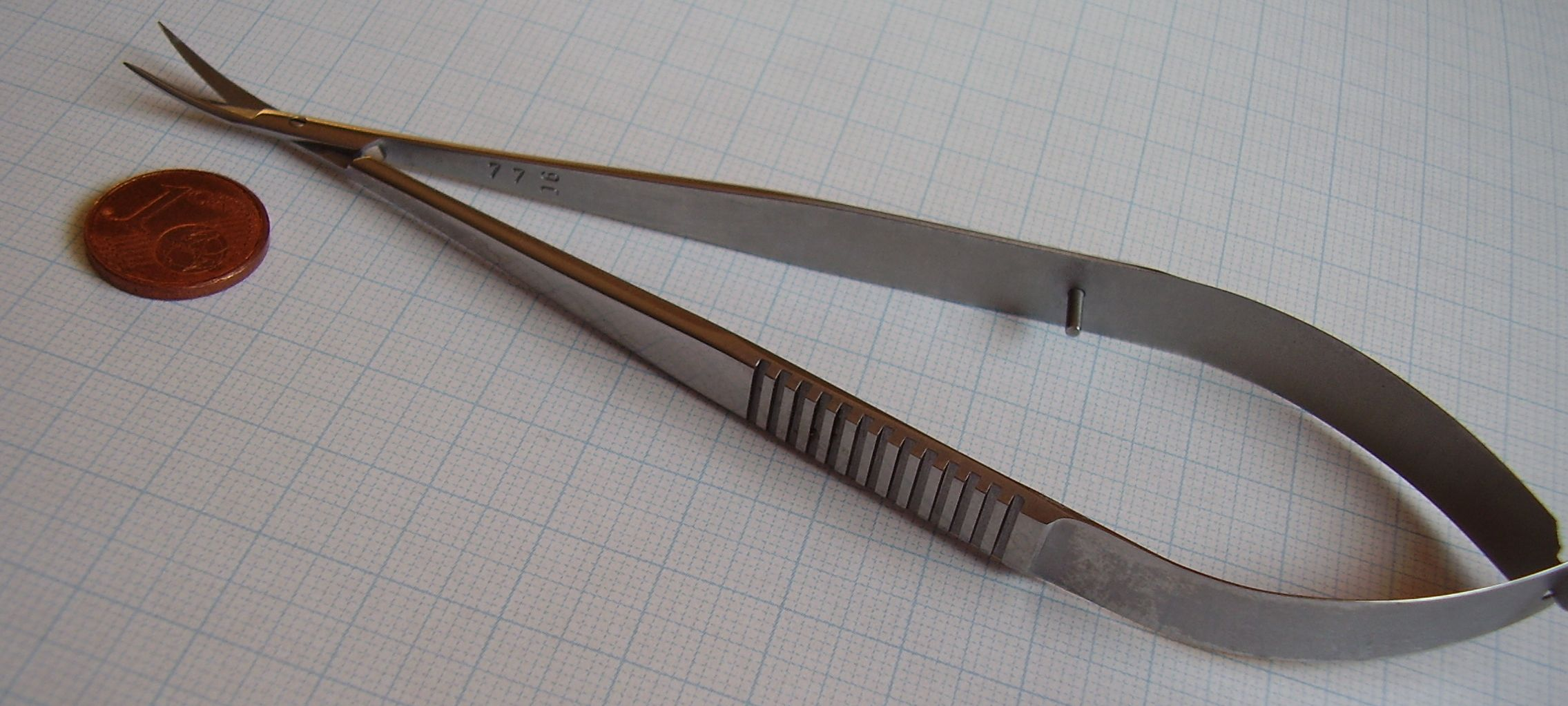
Spring forceps scissors

== See also ==
- Trauma shears
- Bandage scissors
- Hemostat, a surgical clamp resembling scissors
- Needle holder, an instrument resembling scissors used to hold a suturing needle
