= Tenotomy scissors =

Surgical scissors used to perform delicate surgery

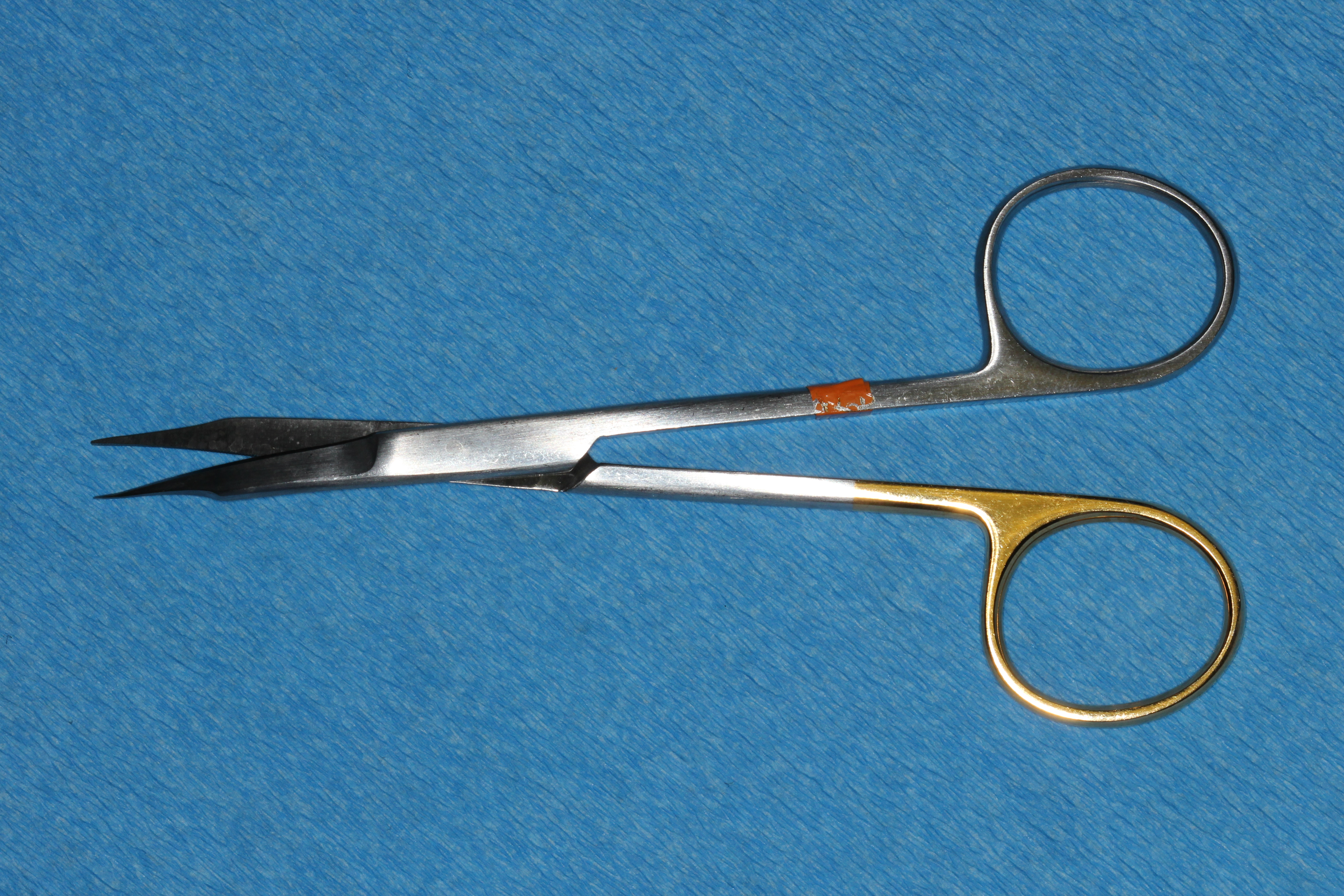
A pair of tenotomy scissors

Tenotomy scissors are surgical scissors used to perform delicate surgery. They can be straight or curved, and blunt or sharp, depending upon necessity. This equipment can be used in many surgical specialties, in particular delicate operations in ophthalmic surgery, oral and maxillofacial surgery, or in neurosurgery.

== See also ==
- Surgical scissors
- Metzenbaum scissors
- Instruments used in general surgery
