= Ernest Wright (scissors maker) =

Traditional scissors manufacturer in Sheffield, England

- Founded: 1902; 124 years ago
- Founder: Ernest Wright Sr.
- Headquarters: Sheffield, England, United Kingdom

Ernest Wright is a traditional scissors manufacturer in Sheffield, England. The firm was established in 1902 by Ernest Wright Sr., the son of a local scissors-borer.

Scissors and shears made by Ernest Wright are marketed to artisans, hobbyists and collectors. The brand's range includes Turton kitchen scissors, stork-shaped embroidery scissors, and shears for tailors and dressmakers. The scissors are manufactured at a small workshop on Broad Lane, Sheffield.

Five generations of the Wright family ran the business until 2018, when owner Nick Wright died in tragic circumstances. The company went into receivership, but was saved from closure when two businessmen and admirers of the firm, Paul Jacobs and Jan-Bart Fanoy, purchased the assets of the company and rehired several of its staff.

A short video documentary about the firm was published on YouTube by Business Insider in April 2020, and has since been viewed over 6.3 million times. In October 2020, Ernest Wright won the Heritage Crafts Association's inaugural President's Award for Endangered Crafts, which was initiated by the Prince of Wales. The following year, Ernest Wright announced that it had purchased its workshop premises on Broad Lane, Sheffield, from its former landlord, and that the workshop would now undergo renovations and have newly acquired historic machinery installed.

Ernest Wright has retained the use of traditional crafting methods and arcane technolect, despite a general decline in the UK handmade scissors trade. The firm's craftspeople are known as ‘putters’, or ‘master-putter-togetherers’.`

A pair of the company’s “Stork Scissors”, created in collaboration with the fashion house JW Anderson, is held in the permanent collection of the Victoria and Albert Museum (V&A).

Phillip E. Wright published a Brochure for the 75th anniversary
