= Nerve hook =

Surgical instrument

Nerve hook illustration

Nerve hook is a surgical instrument that allows surgeon to inspect areas around nerves, especially in the spine. Three main instruments exist, dandy blunt nerve hook (short and blunt), cushing gasserian blunt nerve hook (long) and weary black nerve hook (thin, pointed tip). For surgery under microscope, there is also a specialized instrument, that is called malis nerve hook.
