= Surgical elevator =

Surgical tool

A surgical elevator is a tool used for scraping, elevating or dissecting bones or tissues.

== See also ==
- Instruments used in general surgery
