= Trauma shears =

Scissors for cutting through fabric

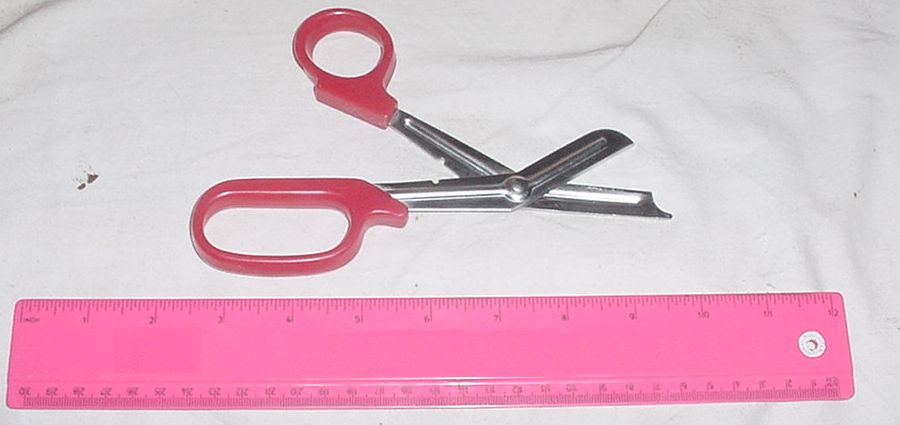
Trauma shears with a 30 cm long ruler for comparison.

Trauma shears, also known as Tuff Cuts (a brand name), are a type of scissors used by paramedics and other emergency medical personnel to quickly and safely cut clothing from injured people. They usually consist of a plastic handle with a metal blade, which is traditionally bent at about 150 degrees, giving them an unusual appearance as compared to normal scissors, and also a longer lever arm.

The shears were designed exclusively for external use and are not suitable for surgical or invasive procedures. Their rugged construction enables them to cut through strong materials such as car seat belts, leather, and denim, and even thin metal and other hard surfaces. They are increasingly being used by fishermen, soldiers and scuba divers as safer alternatives to knives. Hobbyists use them to cut metals such as small coins and copper.

The wide, blunt tip on the shears is designed to slide across skin, minimizing the risk of injuring the patient while cutting clothing.

Bandage scissors are similar in design, though smaller, and are primarily used for sizing or removing dressings and bandages.

== See also ==
- Surgical scissors
