= Tracheotome =

A tracheotome is a medical instrument used to perform an incision in the trachea with a cutting blade operated by a powered cannula. It is often called a tracheostomy tube because once it enters the stoma in the trachea, a breathing tube is connected to a ventilator and oxygen is provided to the lungs.

There are different types of tracheotomes. They can be made of metal, plastic or silicone. Plastic and silicone are widely used since they reduce the complications from the tracheotomy procedure such as subglottic stenosis and erosion of large blood vessels.

== History ==
The tracheostomy procedure is an ancient medical procedure which dates back to 2000 BC. There are some records of physicians performing tracheostomy to save the lives of children and sick people from choking. However, several complications were also common after the procedure was performed due to the severity of the infections and other diseases causing the oxygen obstruction. It was not until the mid-1900s that this medical tool was improved. The introduction of the mechanized tracheotome illustrates how the procedure and the device were improved. The introduction of the mechanized tracheotome by Joseph John Amato in 1972, North Riverside, provided a quicker, cleaner and precise cut which reduced the possibility of tissue damage and infection. Previous procedures for tracheotomy were being implemented at the time, but many would lead to severe complications and were difficult to operate. Most of them required special skills and well trained practitioners.

== Types of tracheotomes ==
=== Mechanized tracheotome ===
The mechanized tracheotome consisted of a staple, cutting blade, specialized plunger and a motor unit. Once the staple was fixed to the neck of the patient, the blade moved forward the skin, fascia and trachea to perform the incision. Then, a plunger moved forward and then backward to hold the tissues . Later, the tracheotome was removed from the patient and only the staple remained in the neck to maintain the trachea open. These were the innovative features of the mechanized tracheotome which were different from the tracheotomes at the time. It was either spring or gas-powered operated.

=== Spring operated tracheotome ===
Other tracheotomes such as the spring operated tracheotome designed by Adamson Howard in 1985, Florida, improved the design by reducing the size and including a rotatable adjustable cap at the mount of the tracheotome to control the depth of penetration in the incision. Its handle also allowed the recocking of the spring operated cutting blade.

=== Other adaptations ===
Leslie William Peterson also made significant contributions to the improvement of the tracheostome. In 2006, his tracheal tube/catheter adaptor cap was introduced and consisted in a cap with two separate projections that allowed the catheter to be in position and prevent their rotation. It also provided heated and/or humidified gas to patients dependent on the breathing machine.

Once the incisions are made by the tracheotome and the stomas are accessible, tracheotome tubes are placed in the trachea to provide oxygen to the lungs. Tubes have also been improved to reduce complications of infection and tissue damage. For instance, Alain Milhay from Amiens, France, invented a tracheotomy tube with shield for anesthesia in 1983. This tube included a conduit for passing on anesthesia and ventilation gases. At the time, other tubes were also implemented for anesthesia application but their material composition was toxic and could give off caustic or toxic vapors.

== Advantages ==
Tracheotomes became very inexpensive medical tools and easy devices to operate. The use of tracheotomes provides immediate oxygen supplies to patients by bypassing obstructions in the upper airway. Tracheotomes provide another alternative for airflow when there are glottic pathological conditions such as neoplasm and bilateral vocal cord paralysis. Also, air obstruction due to neck trauma and facial fracture can be alleviated with the tracheotome incision and oxygen supply.

== Complications ==
Patients may develop different complications after the incision is made with the tracheotome. Although these may be rare, bleeding, air obstruction, damage to the larynx, change of voice, infection, impaired swallowing and permanent scars may occur. This is why the procedure is only performed in case of emergency. Vessels such as the carotid arteries or internal jugular veins could also be damaged if the incision and penetration of the blade is not accurate, with a higher risk in children and obese patients.

== Tracheotome tubes used in conjunction with tracheotomes ==
- Single Cannula Silicone Tube
- Tube with inner cannula
- Metal tube with inner cannula and obturator
- Fenestrated tubes
- Montgomery T-tubes

== See also ==
- Instruments used in general surgery
