= Bandage scissors =

Scissors that often have an angled tip with a blunt tip on the bottom blade

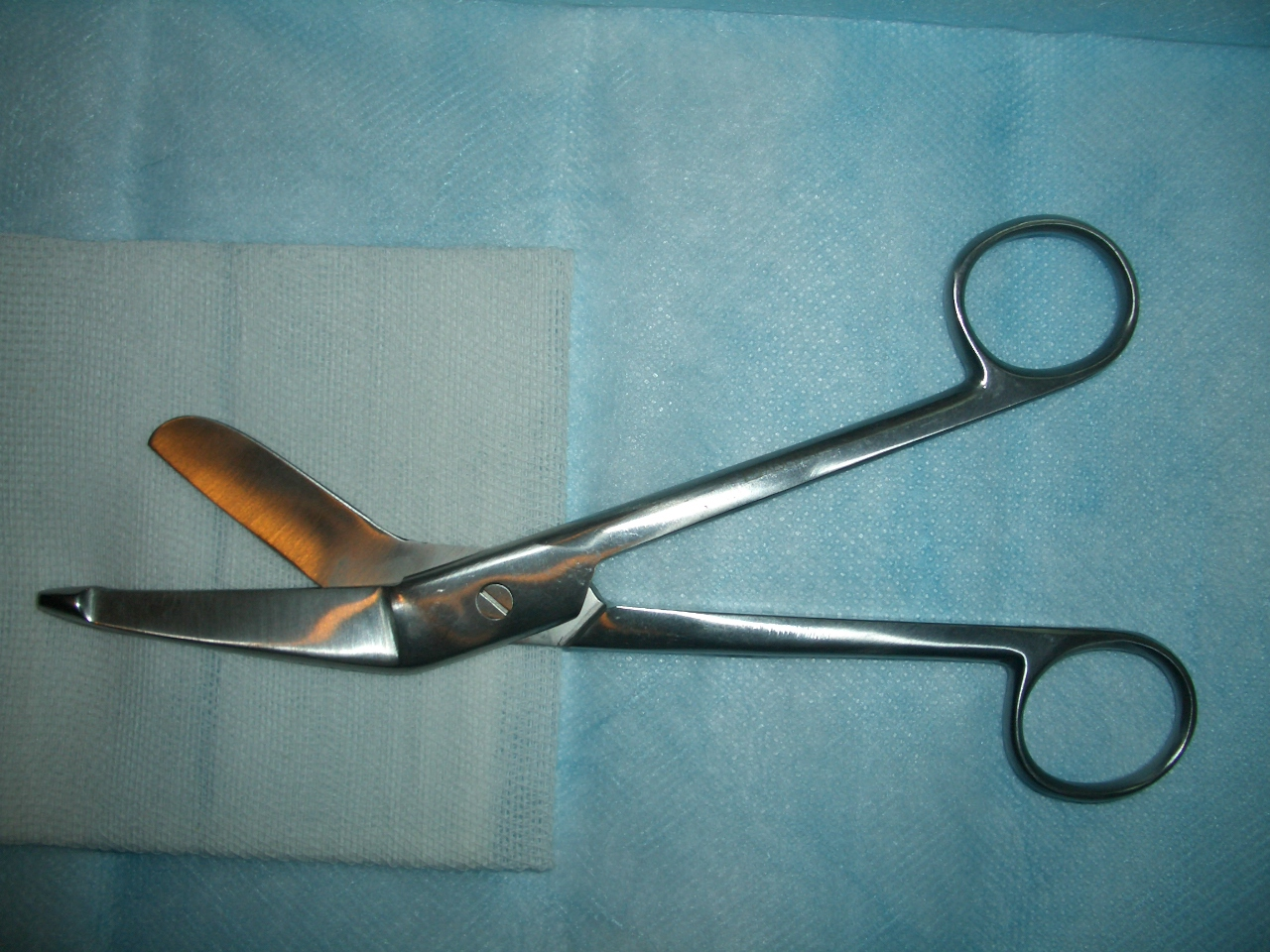
Bandage scissors

Bandage scissors, or bandage forceps, are scissors that often have an angled tip with a blunt tip on the bottom blade. This helps in cutting bandages without gouging the skin. Lister bandage scissors and utility bandage scissors exhibit the well known angle, while Knowles bandage scissors have blades that are either straight or curved.

Bandage scissors are very popular in any health care facility because they are designed to safely lift bandages away from skin for easy cutting. The bottom blade of the scissor is longer and goes easily under the bandages. The blunt tip design of the scissor prevents accidental injury while making bandage removal very easy, smooth, and quick.

== Uses ==
Bandage scissors are mostly used

- To size bandages and dressings
- To cut through medical gauze
- To cut through bandages already in place

== History ==
It is unclear where or how they originated. There is record dating back to 1956 of Preston J. Burnham, M.D. of Salt Lake City using the well known angled blade as opposed to scissors that are straight. There is also mention of bandage scissors within clinical notes on a tape dispenser dating from 1948 although the photo is unclear as to the shape of the scissors.

== See also ==
- Friedrich von Esmarch
- Instruments used in general surgery
- Trauma shears
