= Hair-cutting shears =

Scissors designed for cutting hair

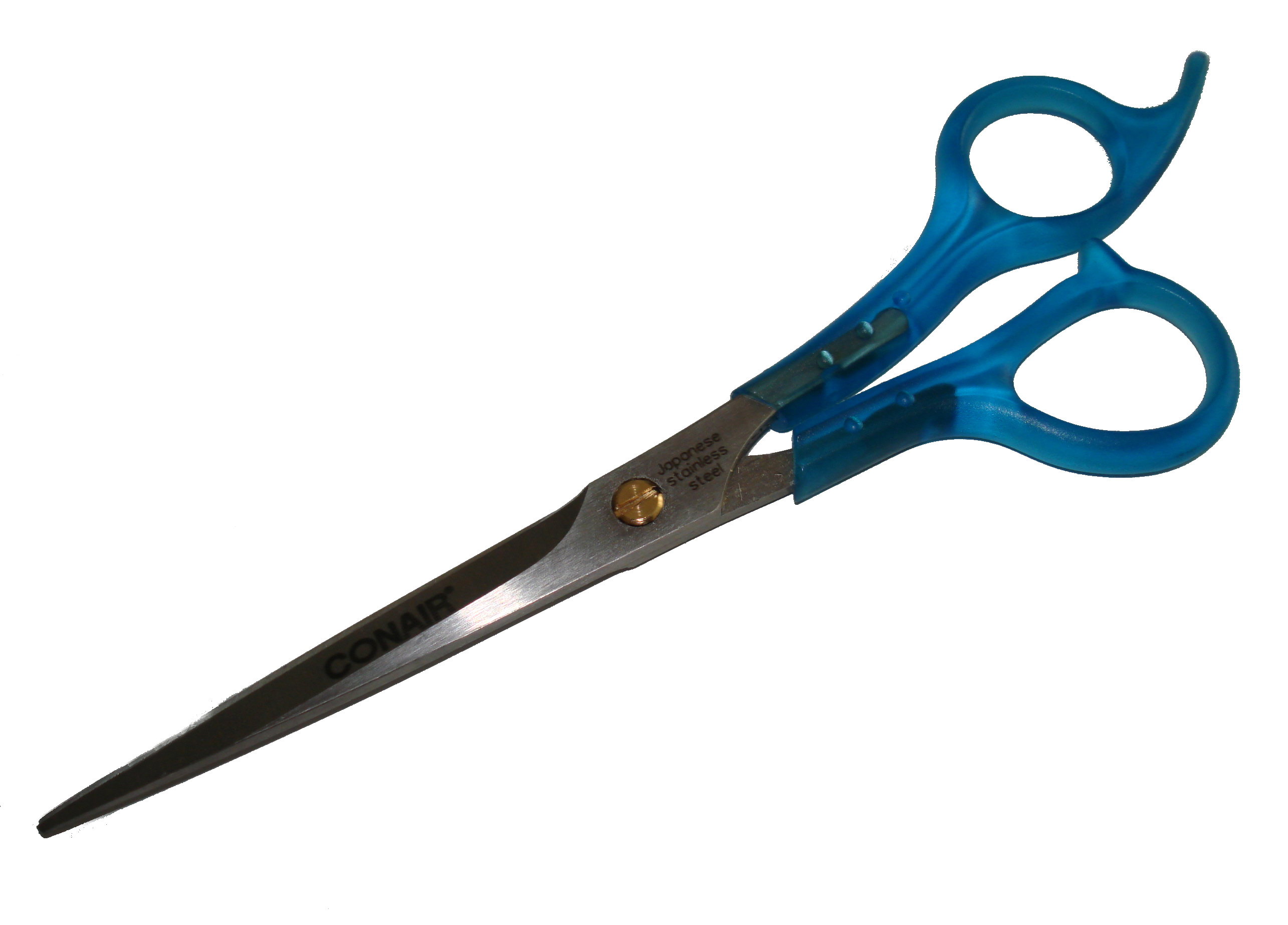
Hair-cutting shears

Hair-cutting shears are scissors that are specifically designed for cutting hair. They are also known as barber shears, hairdressing shears, or hair shears. They range in size from about 5 to 7 inches (13 to 18 cm) long and commonly have an appendage, known as a finger brace or tang, attached to one of the finger rings. This gives the user additional control when cutting. A swiveling thumb ring is new technology in shear design. The swivel shear offers increased flexibility and the ability to keep the wrist straight and the elbow down in all cutting positions, creating more comfort and control.

== Texturizing shears ==
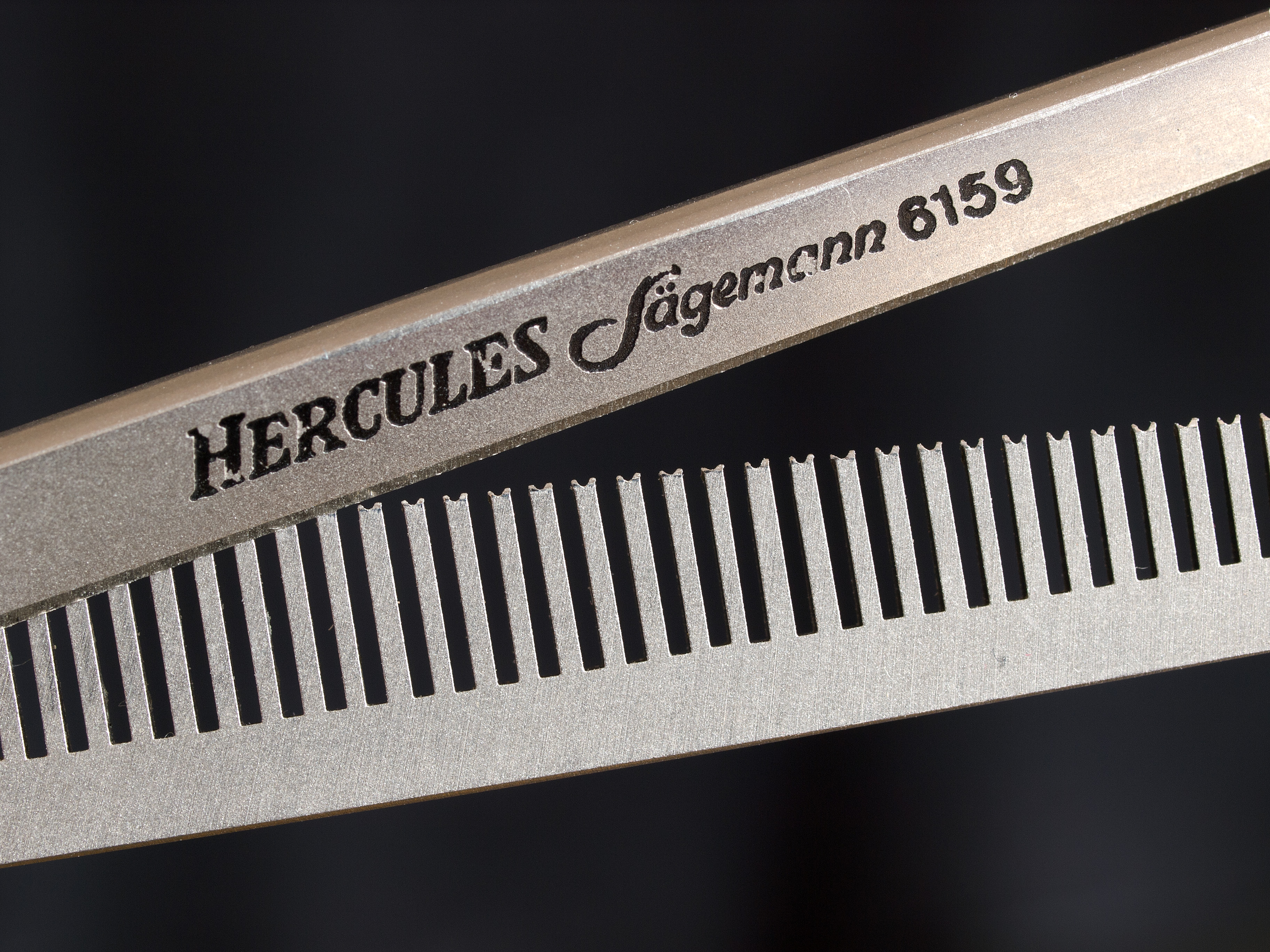
Blades of a pair of texturizing shears

A specialized type of hair-cutting shears known as texturizing shears are used to reduce hair thickness, to create texturizing effects, or to blend layered hair. Texturizing shears have a pair of pivoted blades in the same way as normal shears, but one or both blades have teeth on the edge like a comb. These teeth allow for only some of the hair in a section to be cut in an even fashion, while other parts of that section are left alone. There are also texturizing shears that can come in a range of numbers in teeth, determining how much hair can be thinned out. Texturizing shears may also be called thinning shears or chunking shears.
