= Iris scissors =

Surgical instrument

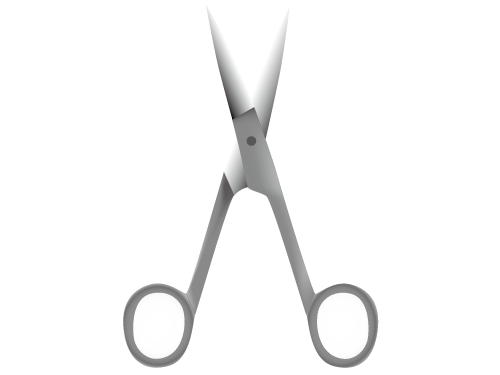
A pair of iris scissors

Iris scissors are a type of scissors with short blades that was originally developed for ophthalmic surgery. They are alternatively referred to as Iris forceps in the United Kingdom and Asia. Iris scissors are also available in the crafting market and are sometimes used for the production of fabric-related goods. Both closed and open shank versions are available.

== Description ==
Iris scissors are very small, with an extremely sharp and fine tip. Some iris scissors have curved blades for certain types of precision tasks, while others have straight blades.

== See also ==
- Surgical scissors
- Instruments used in general surgery
