= Grass shears =

Gardening tool

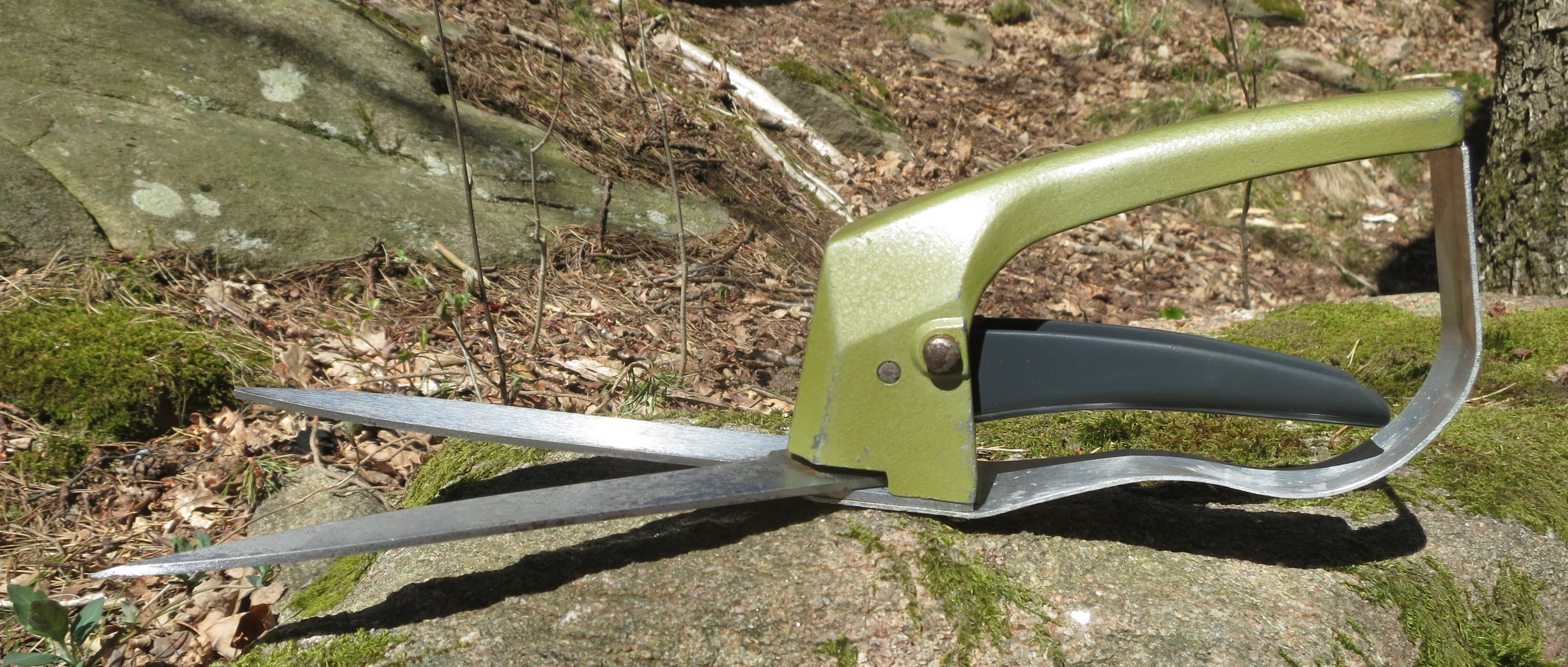
Grass shears from about 1970

Grass shears differ from pruning shears in being long-handled and having the handles at right-angles to the blades. They can be used to cut grass from a standing position. Two kinds are available: with the blades horizontal and with the blades vertical. Horizontal blades are used to remove grass which has not been cut by the lawn mower, while vertical blades are used for trimming the edges of a lawn.

== Background ==
In 1939, a version of the vertical grass shears was invented having a long handle with a lever at the top, and wheels at the bottom with the shears. This enabled the user to trim the edge of the grass near the sidewalk and driveway. Powered trimmers have for all practical purposes replaced this type of grass shears.
