= Blunt dissection =

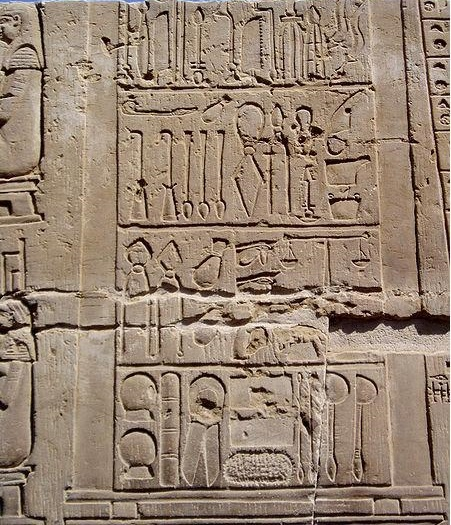
Pictures of mostly blunt surgery tools at Kom Ombo, Egypt

Blunt dissection describes the careful separation of tissues along tissue planes by either fingers or convenient blunt instruments during many diverse surgical procedures. Blunt dissection consumes a large proportion of time in most surgeries and has not changed significantly in centuries. Blunt dissection is contrasted to sharp dissection, the practice of slicing through tissues with scalpels, scissors, electrosurgical instruments, or other technologies.

== Use in pneumothorax ==
Blunt dissection is one method employed prior to the insertion of a chest drain following a pneumothorax. Following incision above the rib (to avoid the neurovascular bundle), blunt dissection of the subcutaneous tissue, external, internal and innermost intercostal muscles allows access to the pleura. Blunt dissection is considered the favoured approach for the insertion of large bore chest tubes since it results in fewer complications.
