= Mayo scissors =

Surgical instrument

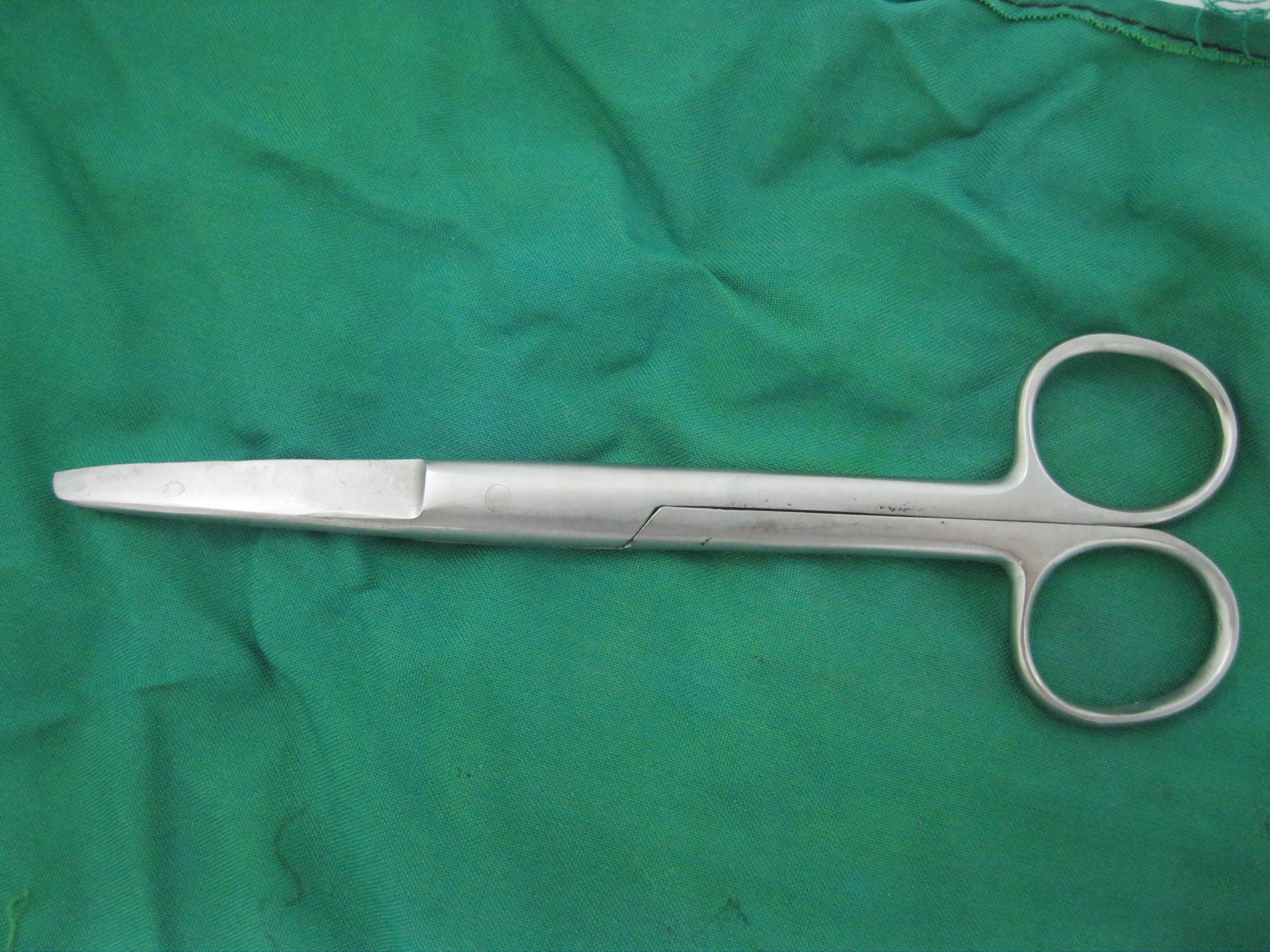
Mayo scissors

Mayo scissors are a type of heavy-bladed surgical scissors, primarily designed for cutting dense connective tissues (e.g. fascia), sutures, meshes, drains and dressings. They are named after the Mayo Clinic, where the scissors design was developed, and are among the most commonly used scissors in modern surgery.

== Description ==
Mayo scissors may be made from stainless steel or titanium, with stainless steel ones being markedly cheaper than titanium ones. They may also be available in standard or extra-long scissors, and typically measure between 150 mm (6 inches) and 170 mm (6 ¾ inches) in length.

Like most other modern-day surgical instruments, a vast majority of Mayo scissors are made from stainless steel and are disposable for convenience: such instruments may be simply thrown away rather than being sterilized and reprocessed after use.

Mayo scissors are similar in shape to the Metzenbaum scissors but are much bulkier, and usually have a slightly smaller shank-to-blade ratio owing to the blade hinge (pivot) being slightly more rearward and closer to the center. The scissors' blades are notably wider with thick, rounded spines, straightened flats and usually semi-blunt tips that have a more rounded angle on the outside but a right-angled corner on the inside (edged side), a feature that distinguishes them from most other surgical scissors. In contrast, Metzenbaum scissors are more slender with an overall smoother, more rounded blade profile, and the tips are symmetrically blunt. Like most other surgical scissors, both have ringed handles.

== Types ==
Mayo scissors are available in both straight and curved blade configurations, each engineered for precision in specialized surgical procedures including general surgeries, veterinary surgeries and podiatric surgery.

- Straight-blade Mayo scissors are designed for cutting body tissues near the surface of a wound. As straight-bladed Mayo scissors are also used for cutting sutures, they are also referred to as "suture scissors".
- Curved-blade Mayo scissors allow deeper penetration into the wound than the type with straight blades. The curved style of Mayo scissor is used to cut thick tissues such as those found in the uterus, muscles, breast, and foot. Mayo scissors used for dissection are placed in tissue with the tips closed. The scissors are then opened so that the tips open and spread out the tissue during the dissection process.

== See also ==
- Instruments used in general surgery
