= Metzenbaum scissors =

Surgical instrument

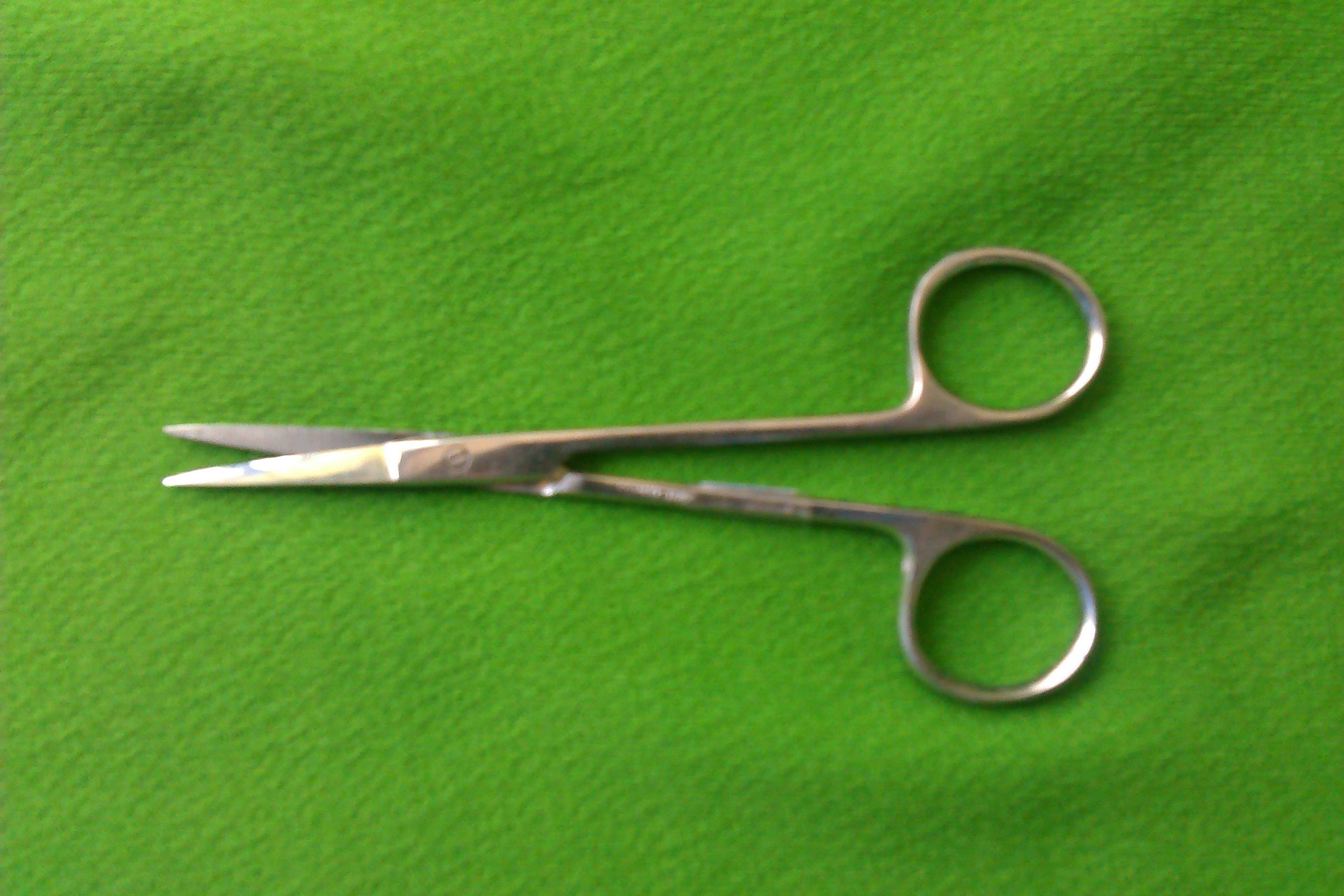
Metzenbaum scissors

Metzenbaum scissors are a type of surgical scissors designed for delicate cutting and blunt dissection of tissues. These scissors are constructed of surgical stainless steel and some have tungsten carbide blade inserts, come in variable lengths and have a relatively high shank-to-blade ratio, and the blades can be curved (usually) or straight. The tips are almost always rounded (blunt), which allows the surgeon to probe and spread tissues apart without causing unwanted sharp injuries. This is the most common type of scissors used in surgical operations on organs and complex neurovascular structures.

== Etymology ==
The name Metzenbaum derives from the designer, Myron Firth Metzenbaum (1 April 1876 – 25 January 1944), an American surgeon who specialized in oral and reconstructive surgery. They are also occasionally referred to as Metzenbaum or Metzenbaum–Lahey forceps, or simply "Metz".

== See also ==
- Mayo scissors
- Surgical instrument
- Surgical scissors
