= Endoscopic foreign body retrieval =

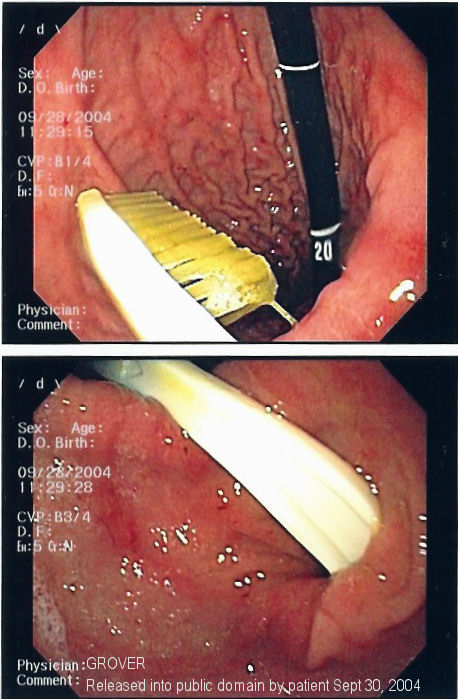
- Endoscopic still of gastric foreign body (toothbrush)
- Specialty: Gastroenterology

Endoscopic foreign body retrieval refers to the removal of ingested objects from the esophagus, stomach and duodenum by endoscopic techniques. It does not involve surgery, but rather encompasses a variety of techniques employed through the gastroscope for grasping foreign bodies, manipulating them, and removing them while protecting the esophagus and trachea. It is of particular importance with children, people with mental illness, and prison inmates as these groups have a high rate of foreign body ingestion.

Commonly swallowed objects include coins, buttons, batteries, and small bones (such as fish bones), but can include more complex objects, such as eyeglasses, spoons, and toothbrushes (see image).

== Indications and contraindications ==
Some patients at risk for foreign body ingestion may not be able to give an accurate medical history of ingestion, either due to age or mental illness. It is important that physicians treating these patients recognize the symptoms of esophageal foreign body impaction requiring urgent intervention. Most frequently, these include drooling and the inability to swallow saliva, neck tenderness, regurgitation of food, stridor and shortness of breath if there is compression of the trachea.

There are several situations in which endoscopic techniques are not indicated, such as for small blunt objects less than 2.5 cm which have already passed into the stomach (as these usually do not obstruct anywhere else), when there is perforation of the esophagus or mediastinitis (inflammation of structures around the esophagus), and for narcotic-containing bags or condoms that have been ingested, because of the risk of overdose if they are ruptured.

Foreign bodies should be removed from the esophagus within 24 hours of ingestion because of a high risk of complication.

== Non-invasive testing ==
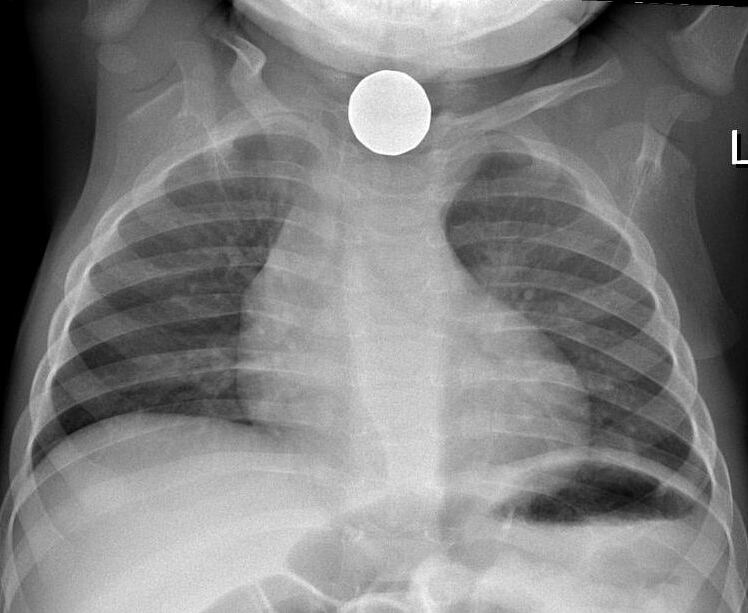
Chest X-ray showing a Canadian dollar coin in the esophagus of a young child

Prior to undertaking endoscopy, attempts should be made to locate the foreign body with x-rays or other non-invasive techniques. For radio-opaque objects, x-rays of the neck, chest and abdomen can be used to locate the foreign body and assist endoscopy. Alternative approaches, including the use of metal detectors, have also been described.

X-rays are also useful for identifying the type of foreign body ingested and complications of foreign body ingestion, including mediastinitis and perforation of the esophagus.

== Endoscopy ==
Endoscopic retrieval involves the use of a gastroscope or an optic fiber charge-coupled device camera. This instrument is shaped as a long tube, which is inserted through the mouth into the esophagus and stomach to identify the foreign body or bodies. This procedure is typically performed under conscious sedation. Many techniques have been described to remove foreign bodies from the stomach and esophagus. Usually the esophagus is protected with an overtube (a plastic tube of varying length), through which the gastroscope and retrieved objects are passed.

Once the foreign body has been identified with the gastroscope, various devices can be passed through the gastroscope to grasp or manipulate the foreign body. Devices used include forceps, which come in varying shapes, sizes and grips, snares, and oval loops that can be retracted from outside the gastroscope to lasso objects, as well as Roth baskets (mesh nets that can be closed to trap small objects), and magnets placed at the end of the scope or at the end of orogastric tubes. Some techniques have been described that use foley catheters to trap objects, or use two snares to orient foreign bodies.

== Alternative methods ==
In veterinary medicine or when there is no endoscope available to extract foreign bodies economically without operation the Hartmann alligator forceps can be used.

== See also ==
- Bezoar
- Schatzki ring
