= Foreign body in alimentary tract =

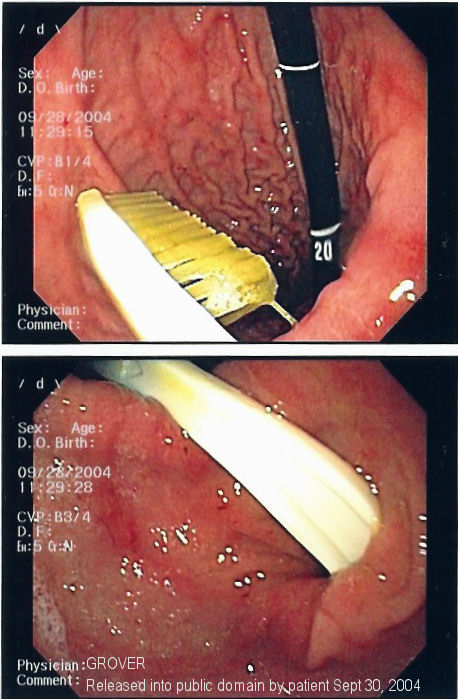
- A foreign body - in this case a swallowed toothbrush - located in the stomach cavity by using an endoscope.
- Specialty: Emergency medicine, gastroenterology

One of the most common locations for a foreign body is the alimentary tract. Foreign bodies can enter the tract either from the mouth, or from the rectum.

The objects most commonly swallowed by children are coins. Meat impaction, resulting in esophageal food bolus obstruction is more common in adults. Swallowed objects are more likely to lodge in the esophagus or stomach than in the pharynx or duodenum.

== Diagnosis ==
For most objects, x-ray images from the front and side will be taken. This will give the location of most objects and help distinguish between ingestion and aspiration. Some objects, such as those made of plastic or wood, may require visualization by ultrasound or CT scan.

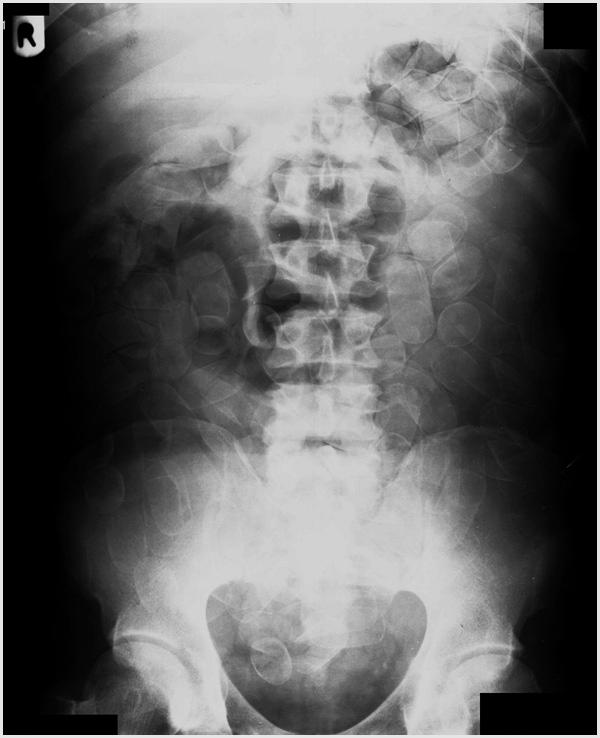
Abdominal X-ray showing small packages of cocaine swallowed by a trafficker.

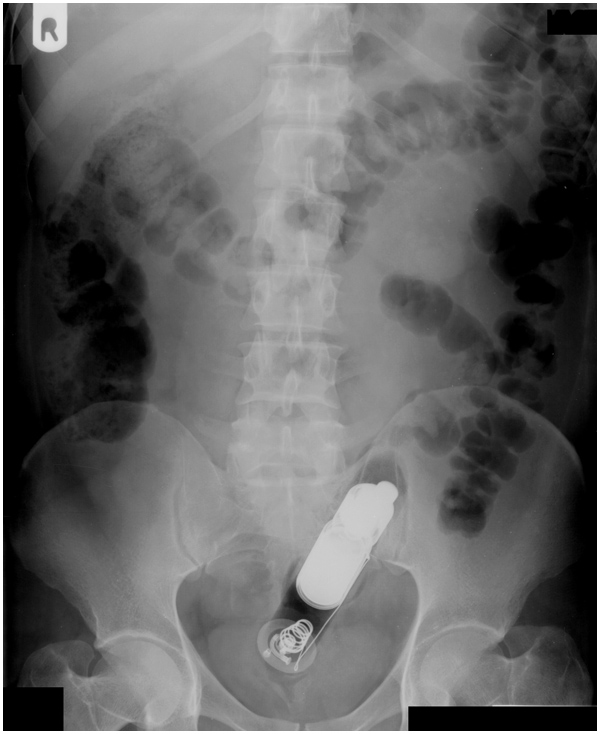
Vibrator stuck in the rectum can be seen on this abdominal X-ray.

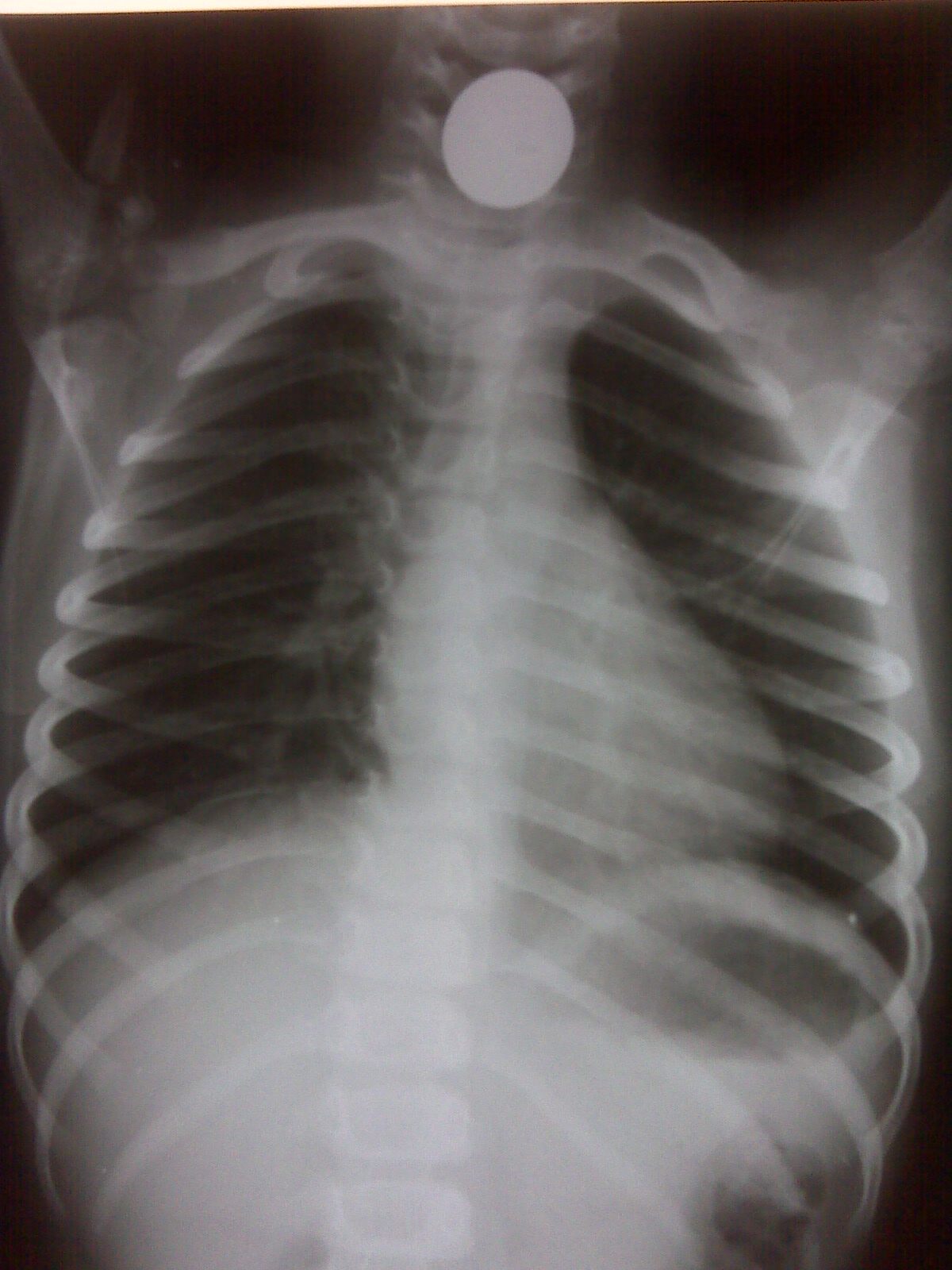
Chest radiograph showing a Venezuelan 25 cent coin lodged in the upper esophagus of a 9-year-old girl.

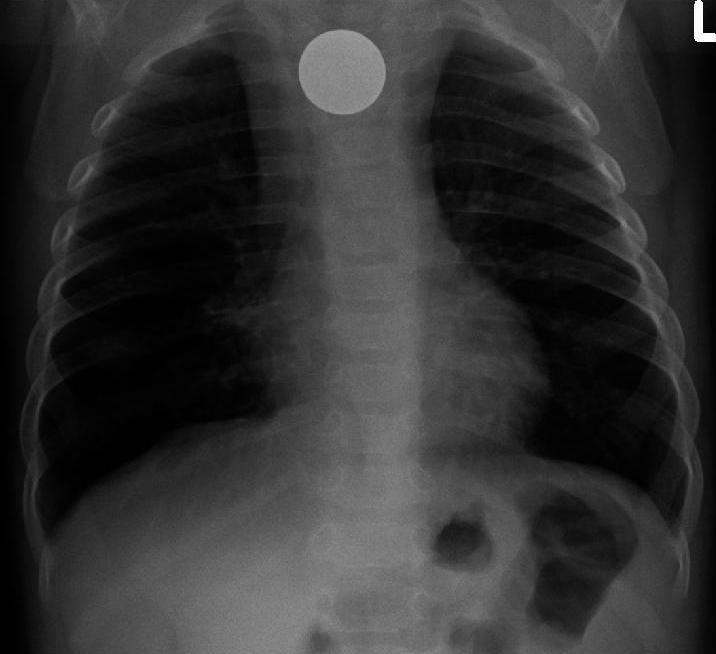
A coin seen on AP CXR in the esophagus

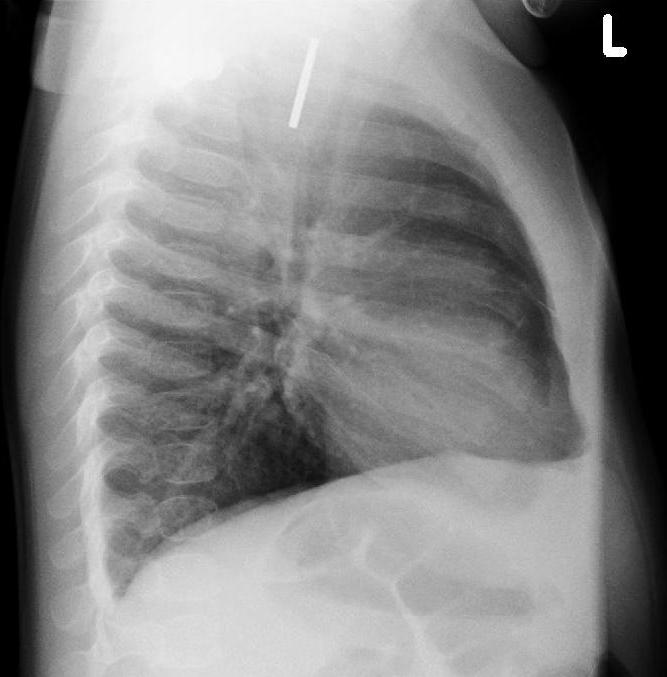
A coin seen on lateral CXR in the esophagus

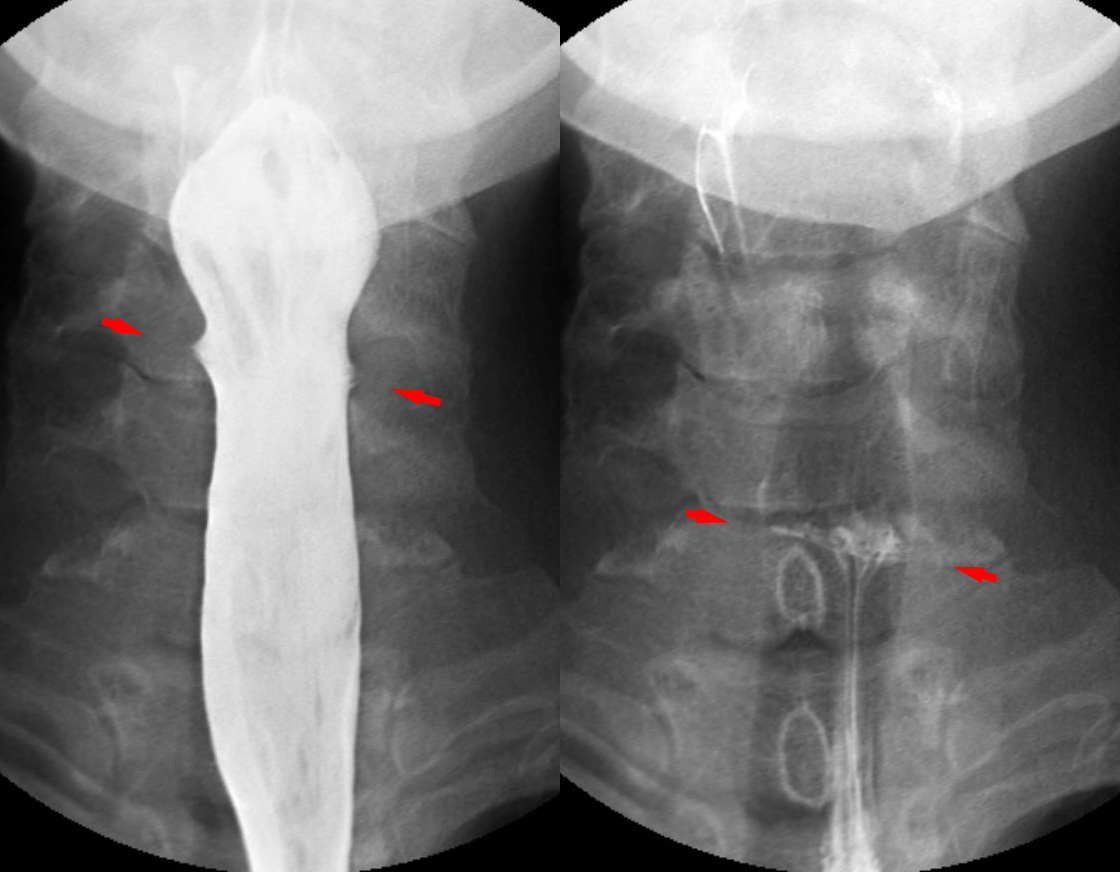
Fishbone pierced in the upper esophagus.Left image during swallowing contrast medium, right image after swallow, only dimly visible.

== Treatment ==
Most objects that are swallowed will, if they have passed the pharynx, pass all the way through the gastrointestinal tract unaided. However, sometimes an object becomes arrested (usually in the terminal ileum or the rectum) or a sharp object penetrates the bowel wall. If the foreign body causes problems like pain, vomiting, or bleeding, it must be removed.

Swallowed batteries can be associated with additional damage, with mercury poisoning (from mercury batteries) and lead poisoning (from lead batteries) presenting important risks.

While swallowed coins typically traverse the alimentary tract without further incident, care must be taken to monitor patients, as reaction of the metals in the coin with gastric acid and other digestive juices may produce various toxic compounds if the coin remains within the alimentary tract for a prolonged period of time.

Endoscopic foreign body retrieval is the first-line treatment for removal of a foreign body from the alimentary tract.

Glucagon has been used to treat esophageal foreign bodies, with the intent that it relaxes the smooth muscle of the lower esophageal spincter to allow the foreign body to pass into the stomach. However, evidence does not support a benefit of treatment with glucagon, and its use may result in side effects.

=== Objective testing of passing small objects ===
In 2018, an international team of six paediatric health-care professionals undertook a self-administered test, by swallowing a Lego piece (specifically, a Lego minifigure head) and checking when the pieces appeared. They developed a Stool Hardness and Transit (SHAT) score to normalise stool consistency over time, resulting in a Found and Retrieved Time (FART) score. The principal finding of this study, the FART score (n = 5), ranged from 1.14 days (27 h 20 min) to 3.04 days (72 h 35 min), with an average retrieval time of 1.71 days. Their conclusion: "This international, multicentre trial identified that small objects, such as those swallowed by children, are likely to pass in 1–3 days without complication. This should offer reassurance for parents."

== See also ==
- 101 Things Removed from the Human Body, 2003 British documentary detailing unusual foreign objects located and removed from patients, including examples found within the alimentary tract.
- Bezoar
- Rectal foreign body
