= Rectal foreign body =

Large bodies found in the rectum in medical context

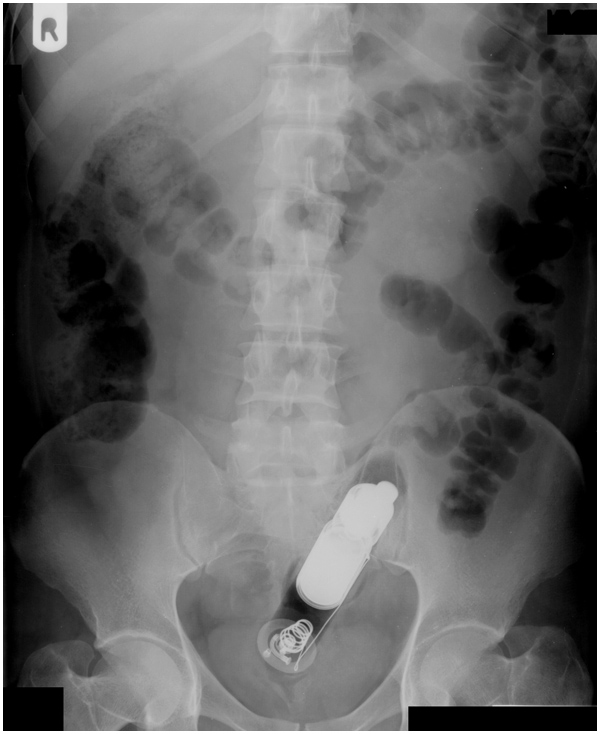
- Radiograph of a male abdomen with a vibrator inside the rectum
- Specialty: Emergency medicine, general surgery

Rectal foreign bodies are large foreign items found in the rectum that can be assumed to have been inserted through the anus, rather than reaching the rectum via the mouth and gastrointestinal tract. It can be of clinical relevance if the patient cannot remove it the way they intended. Smaller, ingested foreign bodies, such as bones eaten with food, can sometimes be found stuck in the rectum upon X-ray and are rarely of clinical relevance.

Rectal foreign bodies are a subgroup of foreign bodies in the alimentary tract.

== Signs and symptoms ==
If the foreign body is too big to allow feces from the colon to pass, a mechanical ileus may occur. The distension of the rectum and the disruption of the peristasis reinforce this effect.

The foreign body may cause infections, destroying the intestinal wall. Depending on the location of the perforation, this may lead to a peritonitis due to the feces or an abscess in the retroperitoneal space.

Smaller objects that injure the intestinal wall, but do not perforate it, may be encapsulated by a foreign body granuloma. They may remain in the rectum as a pseudotumor without any further effects.

=== Complications ===
The most common – but still rare – complication is a perforation of the rectum caused by the foreign object itself or attempts to remove it. Diagnosed perforations are operated immediately by opening the abdomen and removal or suturing of the perforated area. In order to suppress infections, antibiotics are prescribed. Often, a temporary ileostomy is necessary to protect the stitches. After a contrast medium applied by an enema proves the complete healing of the perforated area, the ileostomy is reversed. This usually takes between three and six months. Average hospitalization is 19 days.

Medical literature describes some deaths due to rectal foreign bodies, but they are very rare and usually classified as autoerotic fatality. A 75-year-old patient died due to a rectal perforation caused by a mentally ill person using a cane. Another middle-aged patient died due to a rectal perforation by a vibrator. The perforation was sutured and the patient received intensive medical care, but he contracted acute respiratory distress syndrome and systemic inflammatory response syndrome due to the trauma, resulting in multiple organ dysfunction syndrome and death. There is a paper describing a death after a perforation with a shoehorn. The rectum has to be nursed after a surgical procedure until healing is complete. A 54-year-old man, who had been operated on twice in order to remove a foreign body (a cucumber and a parsnip), died due to a peritonitis after he inserted two apples into the rectum before the wound had healed.

== Causes ==
Reasons for foreign rectal bodies vary wildly, but in most cases they are of sexual or criminal motivation. The foreign body was inserted voluntarily in the vast majority of cases. This especially includes sexually motivated behaviour, encompassing the majority of cases. Bodypacking, i.e. illegal transport of drugs within a body orifice (here: inside the rectum), is another – potentially – voluntary reason for insertion of foreign rectal bodies. This includes attempts to transport objects like weapons, including knives, or ammunition. According to one study, sexual stimulation was responsible for 80% of clinically relevant foreign rectal bodies. About 10% of the cases were due to sexual assault.

In rare cases, the patient inserted the object into the rectum without a way to remove it intending to receive attention and pity from doctors and nurses. This behaviour is categorized as Munchausen's syndrome.

Another cause may be attempted self-treatment of diseases. One patient attempted to treat his chronic diarrhea by inserting an ear of maize into his rectum. Another patient tried to soothe the itching due to his hemorrhoids (Pruritus ani) with a toothbrush. The toothbrush went out of control and disappeared inside his anus.

Accidents or torture may cause an involuntary insertion of a foreign body. A mercury medical thermometer inserted into the anus in order to measure the temperature, but broke off while inside, is an example of a foreign rectal body due to an accident. Ancient Greece knew the Rhaphanidosis as a punishment for male adulterers. It involved the insertion of a radish into the anus. Many self-inserted rectal bodies are stated as accidentally by the patients due to feelings of shame.

There are several reasons that contribute to the jamming of rectal bodies inside the rectum. Many of the objects used for sexual stimulation have a conical tip in order to facilitate penetration, while the base is flat. Extraction by the user may be impossible if the base of the object passed the anus towards the rectum. In order to receive a stronger stimulation, the object may be inserted deeper than intended. In this case, the sphincter prevents, by mechanical means, the extraction of the foreign body.

=== By mouth ===
The other way for a foreign body to travel through the digestive system (after oral intake and passage through the entire intestines) happens very often, but is only rarely medically relevant. Other constrictions, such as the esophagus, cardia, pylorus or ileocecal valve tend to cause issues with other organs, provided a foreign body is large enough to be an issue. Some foreign bodies may still pass those narrows and may cause medically relevant issues, i.e. toothpicks and bones. Bones especially, i.e. from chickens, cause about two thirds of all intestinal perforations.

Plant-based food, especially seeds like popcorn, watermelon, sunflower and pumpkin seed, may clump together inside the lower intestines to form bezoars. Those may grow too big for normal anal passage, thus becoming clinically relevant. This kind of rectal foreign body happens chiefly in children, especially in Northern Africa and the Middle East, where those seeds form an elemental part of the diet. In very rare cases, seeds inside a bezoar may germinate inside the lower intestines or the rectum, causing a blockade.

=== Objects ===
Type and size of the foreign rectal bodies are diverse and may exceed the anatomical-physiological imagination.

Objects documented in literature include:

- Razor, screw, screwdriver, small rolled tool bag (15×12 cm, including tools 620 g), hairpin, milk can opener, drill bit
- Short staffs, such as a 27 cm long chair leg, a 19 cm long spade handle and a broken off broom handle, extension parts for a vacuum cleaner
- Containers, sometimes exceeding 0.5 L in volume, e.g. sparkling wine bottles, bottles of Coca-Cola, jam pots, small beer glasses, cups
- Spray can, light bulb, vacuum tube, candle
- WWII artillery shell requiring attention from a bomb squad
- Table tennis ball, Boccia ball
- Ammunition, firecracker
- Vibrator, rubber rod, dildo
- a toy car
- spectacles, a suitcase key, a tobacco pouch and a magazine at the same time
- plastic tooth brush case

Not all objects are solid. In 1987, a case was documented of a patient who administered a cement enema. After it solidified and impacted, the resulting block had to be surgically extracted. Another extreme case occurred in November 1953. A depressed man inserted a 15 cm long cardboard tube into his rectum and tossed a lighted firecracker into the tube's opening, resulting in a large hole in his rectum.

== Diagnosis ==
Feelings of shame during the anamnesis may lead patients to provide information only reluctantly. This may lead to missing information that may be important during therapy. For the same reason, patients may not visit a doctor until very late. Trusting and sensitive care is paramount for a successful therapy and may be life-saving.

Usually, several radiological images are recorded in order to pinpoint the precise place and depth of the foreign body. This is usually done by X-ray. Foreign bodies made from low-contrast material (e.g. plastics) may necessitate medical ultrasound or a CT scan. Magnetic resonance imaging is contraindicated, especially if the foreign body is unknown. Foreign rectal bodies may penetrate deep into the colon, in certain circumstances up to the right colic flexure.

An endoscopy, which may also be of use during therapy, facilitates the identification and localisation of the object inside the rectum.

Information about the foreign body obtained in those ways are of high importance during therapy, as a perforation of the rectum or the anus is to be absolutely avoided.

== Treatment ==
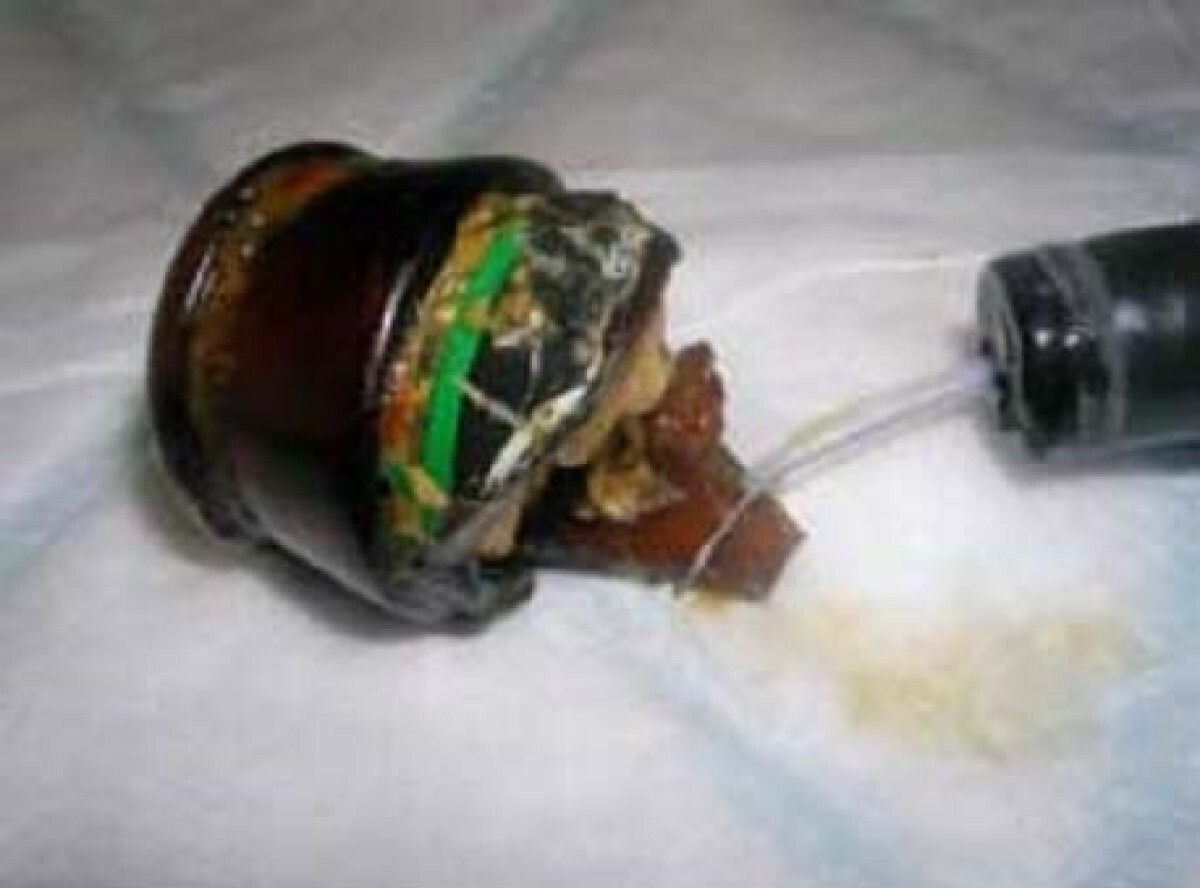
Endoscopic sling with the fragment of a glass bottle.

The therapeutic measures to remove the foreign body can be as diverse as the objects inside the rectum. In many instances, the foreign bodies consist of fragile materials, such as glass. Most patients wait for several hours or even days until they visit a doctor. Before they do, they often repeatedly try to remove the object themselves or by a layperson. This often worsens the situation for a successful extraction.

In most cases, the foreign body can be removed endoscopically. Vibrators, for example, can be often removed using a large sling usually used to remove polyps during coloscopy. A flexible endoscope can be of no help with large and jammed objects. It may be preferable to use rigid tools in those cases.

There have been several cases where instruments used in child birth have proven their worth for the removal of those foreign bodies, such as the forceps and suction cups. Wooden objects have been retrieved with corkscrews and drinking glasses after filling them with plaster. A spoon can be used as an "anchor" by leaving it inside the glass during the plaster filling, removing it together with the glass. Light bulbs are encased in a gauze shroud, shattered inside the rectum and extracted.

There have been successful cases using argon-plasma coagulation. The object in question was a green apple wrapped in cellophane inside the rectum of a 44-year-old patient. The argon-beam coagulation shrunk the apple by more than 50%, enabling its removal. Previous extraction attempts using endoscopic tools failed due to the flat surface of the object.

If the object is too far up, in the area of the colon sigmoideum, and cannot be removed using one of the above methods, bed rest and sedation can cause the object to descend back into the rectum, where retrieval and extraction are easier.

In difficult cases, a laparotomy may be necessary. Statistically, this is the case in about 10 percent of patients. The large intestine can be manipulated inside the abdominal cavity, making it possible for it to wander in the direction of the anus and be grabbed there. A surgical opening of the large intestines can be indication in very difficult cases, especially if the manipulation of the object may pose a serious health risk. This may be the case with a jammed drug condom.

=== Anaesthesia ===
Mild cases may need a sedation at most. Local and spinal anaesthesia find common use. Difficult interventions may need general anaesthesia; surgical opening of the abdominal cavity or the colon require it. General anaesthesia can be beneficial for the relaxation of the sphincter.

=== Aftercare ===
After the surgery, a sigmoidoscopy – a colonoscopy focused on the first 60 cm of the colon – is good practice in order to rule out possible perforation and injury of the rectum and the colon sigmoideum. Stationary aftercare may be indicated.

=== Examples ===
Object	Procedure	Anaesthesia	Source
Ball pen	Polypectomy sling	N.A.	
Water-filled balloon	Punction	N.A.	
Chicken bone	Polypectomy sling	N.A.	
Toothpick	Polypectomy sling	N.A.	
Apple in cellophane	Defragmentation using APC	none	
Glass bottle	Biopsy forceps	General anaesthesia	
Vibrator	Polypectomy sling	none	
Vial	Sengstaken–Blakemore tube	N.A.	
Vial	Polypectomy sling	N.A.	
Enema tip	Polypectomy sling	N.A.	
Vibrator	Biopsy forceps	N.A.	
Pencil	Polypectomy sling	N.A.	
Iron rod	Two-channel endoscope and wires	N.A.	
Bottleneck	Foley catheter	General anaesthesia	
Spray tank	Achalasy balloon	None	
Sponge-like toy ball	Suction cup	General anaesthesia	
Vibrator	Forceps and anal dilation	Local anaesthesia	
Vibrator	Hooked tongs	Local anaesthesia	
Bottle of aftershave	Bone holding forceps with rubber feet	Spinal anaesthesia	
Chicken bone	Fingers	None	
Aerosol-can cap	Grasping forceps and anal dilation	General anaesthesia	
Vase	Filling with plaster	General anaesthesia	
Glass container	Extraction using plaster	Spinal anaesthesia	
Glass container	Tracheal tube	Local anaesthesia	
Apple	Two-handed manipulation	Local anaesthesia	
Glass container	Foley catheter	General anaesthesia	
Glass bottle	Suction cup	General anaesthesia	
100-watt electric bulb	Three Foley catheters	N.A.	
Thermometer	Biopsy forceps	General anaesthesia	
Vibrator	transanal Kocher's forceps	Local anaesthesia	
Bowling bottle (Bottle in the shape of a pin)	Forceps	General anaesthesia	
Perfume bottle	manual	Spinal anaesthesia	
Piece of wood	manual	General anaesthesia	
Toothbrush container	Fogarty catheter	N.A.	
Oven mitt	Forceps, after anal dilation	General anaesthesia	
Drainpipe	forceps in childbirth	General anaesthesia	
Pétanque ball	Electromagnet	General anaesthesia	
Carrot	Myoma lifter	N.A.	
Glass object	Suction cup	Spinal anaesthesia	
Rubber ball	manual extraction after anal dilation	General anaesthesia	
Wooden staff	Two-handed anal dilation	Spinal anaesthesia	
Bottle	manual after anal dilation	General anaesthesia	
Dildo	Myoma lifter	N.A.	
Light bulb	Abdominal compression	Spinal anaesthesia	

APC = Argon beam-coagulation
N.A. = Not available

(Source:)

== Epidemiology ==
There is no reliable data about the incidence of clinically meaningful foreign rectal bodies. It may have increased in the long term as it is observed more often in recent times.

The incident rate is significantly higher for men than for women. The gender ratio is in the area of 28:1. A metastudy in the year 2010 found a ratio of 37:1. Median age of the patients was 44.1 years, with a standard deviation of 16.6 years. Rectal foreign bodies are not an unusual occurrence in hospital emergency rooms.

The first documented case dates from the 16th century.

== Other animals ==
Foreign rectal bodies are rare in veterinary medicine. A passage through the entire intestines, followed by a stay inside the rectum is – as with humans – rare. Animals may have bezoars out of different materials, which may migrate to the rectum and cause problems.

== Ig Nobel Prize ==
The Ig Nobel Prize was awarded in 1995 to David B. Busch and James R. Starling from Madison, Wisconsin, for their 1986 article Rectal foreign bodies: Case Reports and a Comprehensive Review of the World's Literature (see List of Ig Nobel Prize winners).

== See also ==
- Đorđe Martinović incident
- Foreign body in alimentary tract
- Urethral foreign body insertion
- Butt plug
