= Fish bone =

Bony skeleton of fish

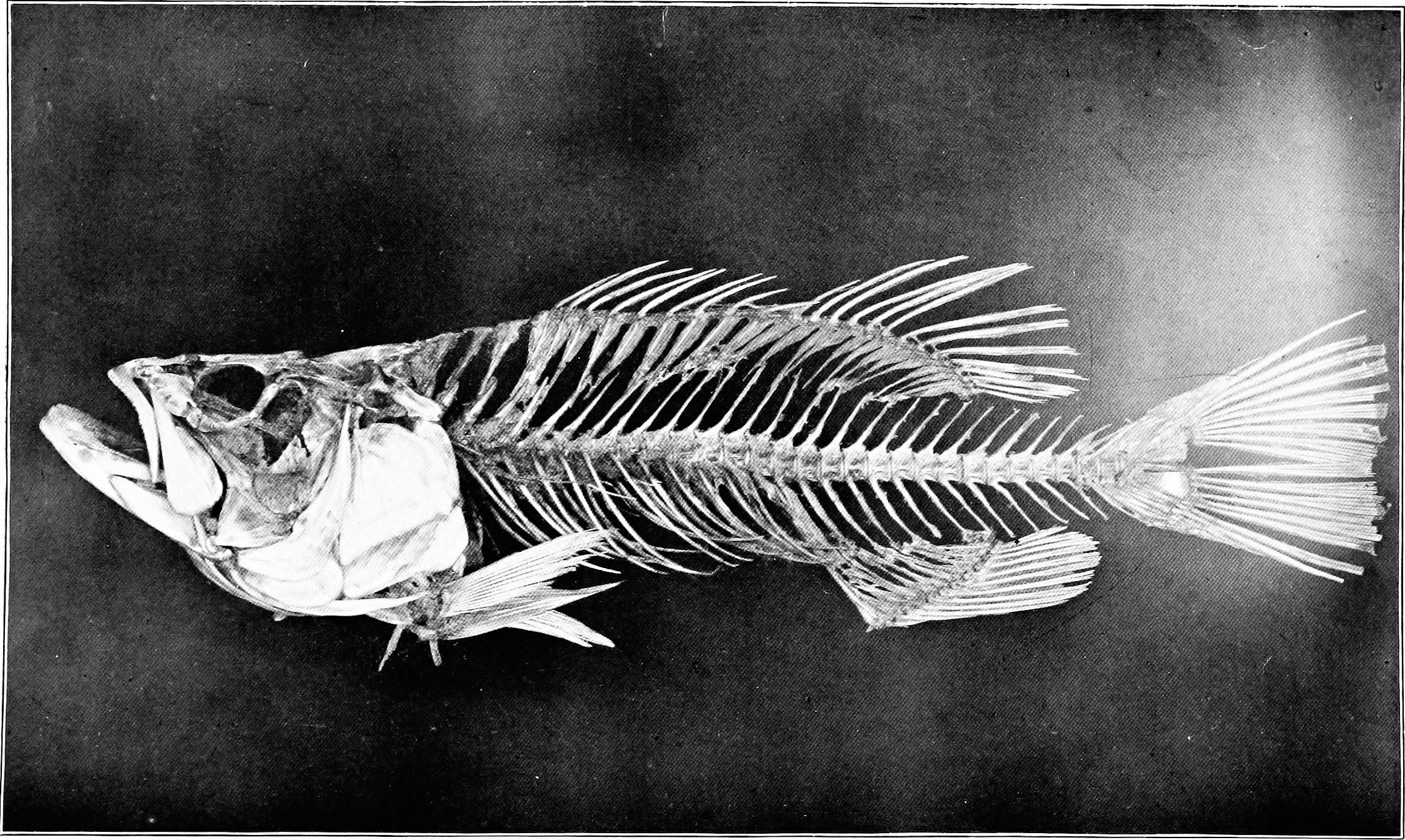
Bones of a black bass

Fish bone is any bony tissue in a fish, although in common usage the term refers specifically to delicate parts of the non-vertebral skeleton of such as ribs, fin spines and intramuscular bones. Not all fish have fish bones in this sense; for instance, eels and anglerfish do not possess bones other than the cranium and the vertebrae.

Fish bones support the core muscles without inhibiting their mobility. There are several series of fish bones: Epineuralia, Epicentralia, Epipleuralia and Myorhabdoi.

In cuisine, fish bones are usually removed and not eaten. Because of their slim, tapered shape, fish bones may get swallowed by accident and cause painful foreign body obstruction in the esophagus, which will have to be surgically removed by a doctor.

Fish bones have been used to bioremediate lead from contaminated soil.

== See also ==
- Fish meal
