= Lung aspiration =

Lung aspiration may refer to:

- Foreign body aspiration
- Pulmonary aspiration
