= Needle holder =

Surgical instrument

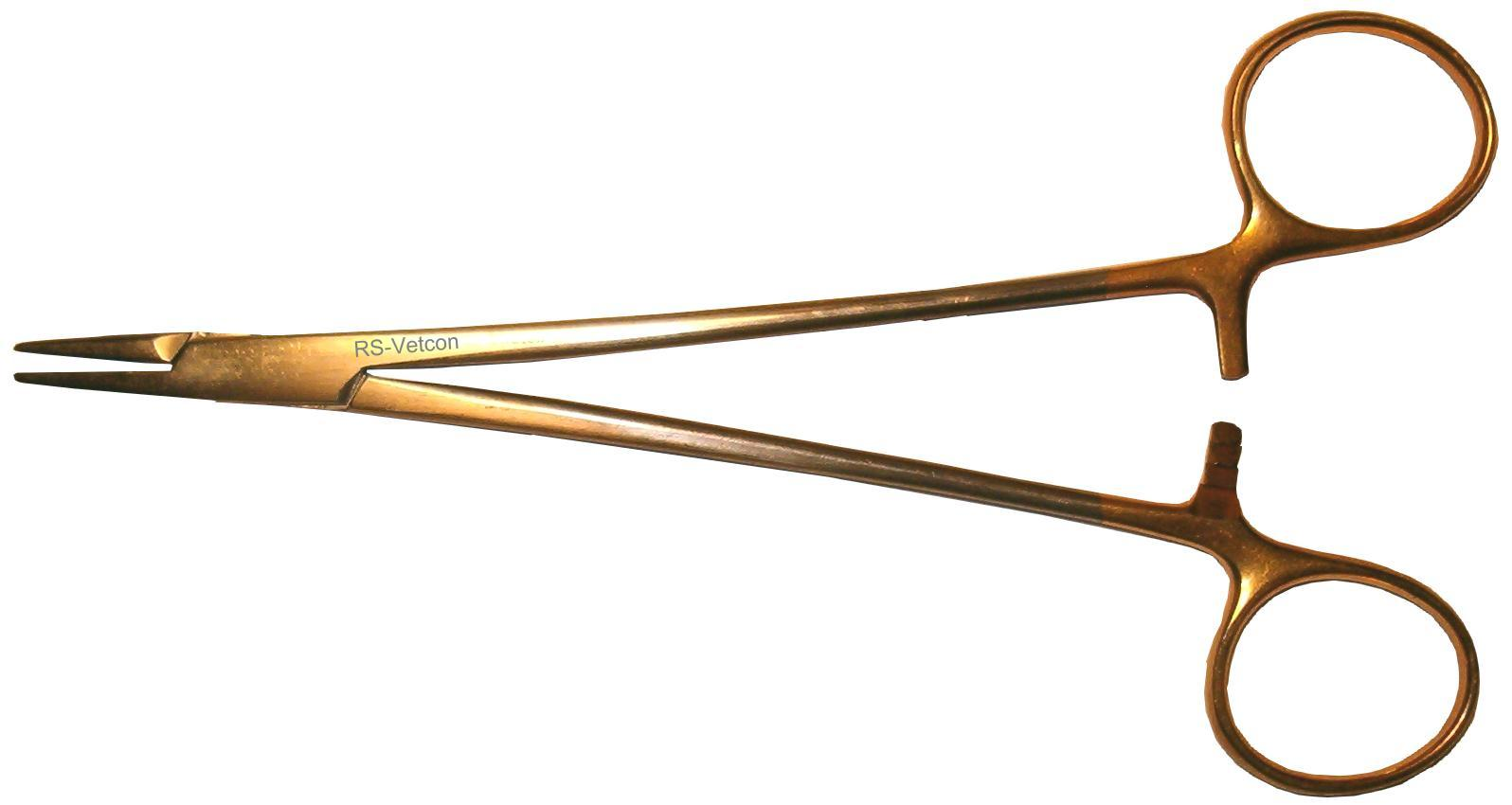
A standard general surgical needle holder, with a ratchet handle lock.

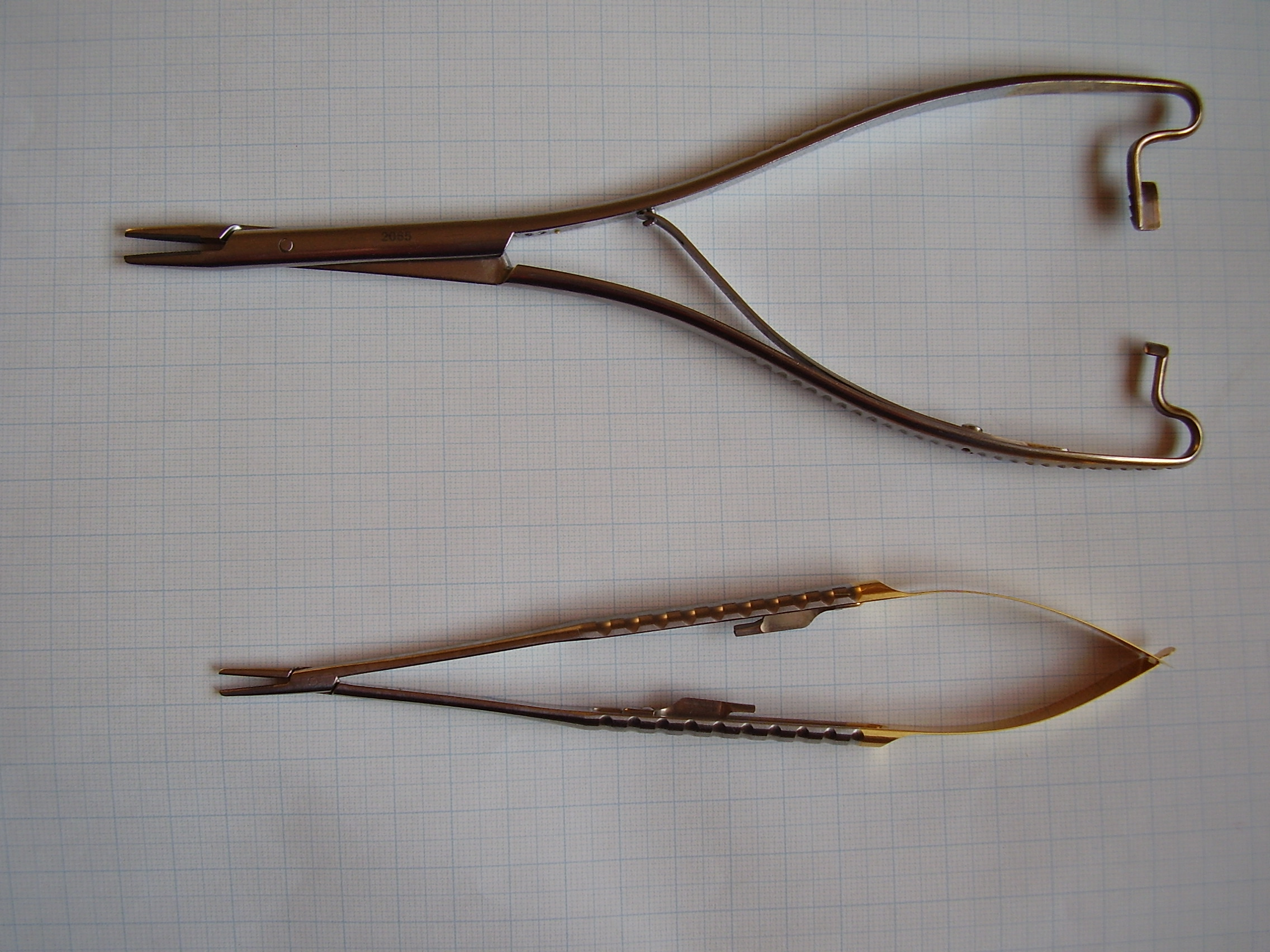
Two specialty needle holders, Mathieu needle holder (above) and Castroviejo needle holder (below).

A needle holder, also called needle driver or needle forceps, is a surgical instrument similar to a hemostat, used by doctors and surgeons to hold and push a suturing needle when performing wound closure, ligation and other surgical procedures that require re-anastomosis.

Being specialized forceps, the components of a typical needle holder are the jaws (often reinforced with tungsten carbide inserts), the hinged joint and the handles (typically with finger rings at the end). Most needle holders also have a ratchet mechanism that locks the handles together and clamps the needle firmly between the jaws, allowing the user to maneuver the needle through various tissues without having to keep squeezing the grip. To maintain a firm grip on the needle, the jaws are often textured and short compared to the handles (increasing the mechanical advantage using the principle of a lever).

Most needle holders are designed to be gripped with the fingers and palm like scissors. However, some are designed for a tweezers-like grip to allow finer, more precise movements around delicate structures or narrow spaces. An example of such is the Castroviejo needle holder (named after Spanish American eye surgeon Ramón Castroviejo), which is commonly used in eye surgery, microsurgery and dental surgery.

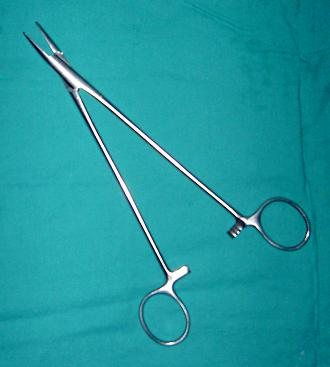
Mayo-Hegar needle driver

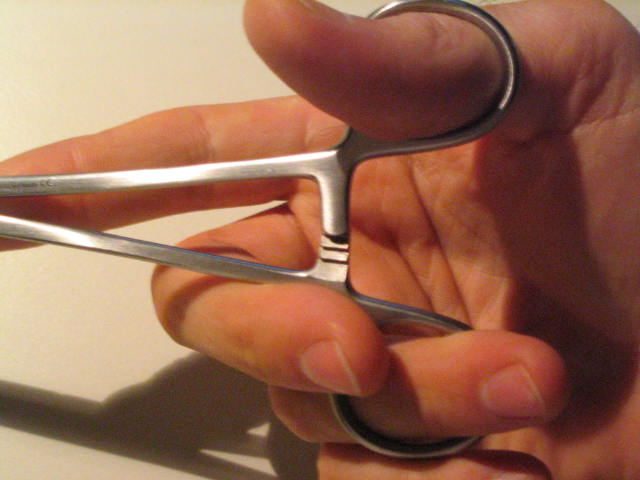
Close-up of a Mayo-Hegar needle driver showing its locking ratchet mechanism

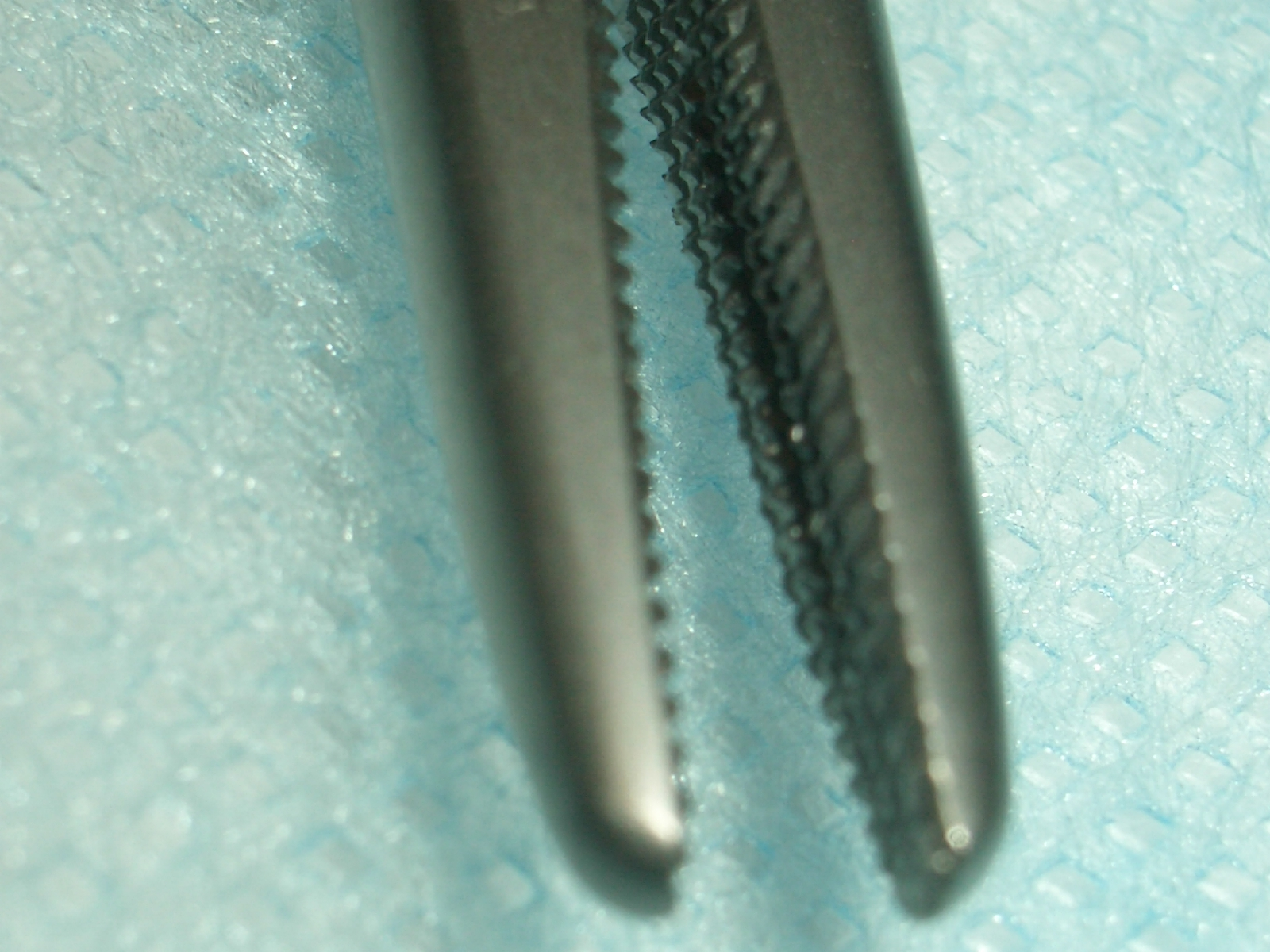
Close-up of a needle driver showing the cross-serrated teeth of its jaws
