= Respiratory-driven protocols =

A respiratory driven protocol is an algorithmic medical process applied by respiratory practitioners as an extension of the physician. Respiratory-driven protocols are implemented in hospitals for treatment of people suffering from asthma, bronchiolitis, and other respiratory illness. Respiratory-driven protocols are most widely applied in intensive-care units. Respiratory practitioners are not utilized globally, so most application of respiratory practitioners as physician-extenders in this fashion is in the United States.

== Cost-reduction ==
Respiratory practitioners applying respiratory-driven protocols was initially designed and has been since shown to reduce patient cost and improve overall patient outcomes.

== Benefits ==
Respiratory-driven protocols have been shown to decrease hospital stays and improve overall outcomes in pediatric populations requiring respiratory intervention such as mechanical ventilation.
