= 101 Things Removed from the Human Body =

- Directed by: Eric Schotz
- Country of origin: United Kingdom
- Original language: English

Production
- Producer: Andrew Yex

Original release
- Release: 2003

101 Things Removed from the Human Body and 101 More Things Removed from the Human Body is a British "shockumentary" series directed by Eric Schotz, which is narrated by Mitch Lewis.

The program features tales of foreign objects that have been removed from human bodies in the form of a countdown from 101 to 1. Items included are javelins, a boat anchor, a bicycle pump, a bag of nails, an ice pick, and a human body.

The documentary series was first broadcast on Sky One in October 2003. When the show was re-broadcast on the terrestrial Channel 4 in July 2004, the British television watchdog OFCOM received complaints over the show causing offence.

A one-off program of the same name was also broadcast on Fox in United States in July 2003. The show received high ratings, and was number one in its time slot.

In 2006, 101 More Things Removed from the Human Body was released. It features items that have been removed from people such as tree boughs, a 3/4" drill bit, a pipe, a knife, a swordfish, and a maggot. All persons featured in the program who had items removed from their body survived. This program also aired in the USA on the Discovery network's "The Learning Channel" in October 2007.

The program contains stories, including a man having a uterus and a man with a teratoma, a type of large tumor. The large jaw tumor segment featured the work Mercy Ships, who have operated floating hospital ships in impoverished areas around the world.

== See also ==
- Darwin Awards
- Phineas Gage
