= Foreign body =

Object originating outside the body of an organism

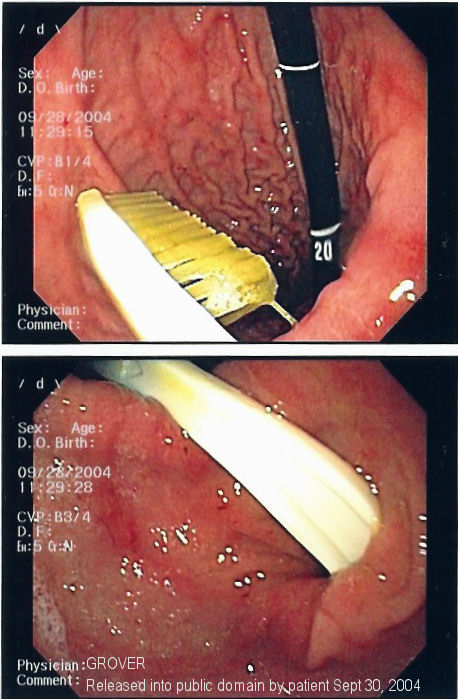
- An endoscopy image of the stomach, showing a foreign body in the form of a swallowed toothbrush.
- Specialty: Emergency medicine
- Types: Foreign body in alimentary tract; Foreign body aspiration; Rectal foreign body; Urethral foreign body; Vaginal foreign body; Retained surgical instruments

A foreign body (FB) is any object originating outside the body of an organism. In machinery, it can mean any unwanted intruding object.

Most references to foreign bodies involve propulsion through natural orifices into hollow organs.

Foreign bodies can be inert or irritating. If they irritate they will cause inflammation and scarring. They can bring infection into the body or acquire infectious agents and protect them from the body's immune defenses. They can obstruct passageways either by their size or by the scarring they cause. Some can be toxic or generate toxic chemicals from reactions with chemicals produced by the body, as is the case with many examples of ingested metal objects.

With sufficient force (as in firing of bullets), a foreign body can become lodged into nearly any tissue.

== Gastrointestinal tract ==
One of the most common locations for a foreign body is the alimentary tract.

It is possible for foreign bodies to enter the tract from the mouth or rectum.

Both children and adults experience problems caused by foreign objects becoming lodged within their bodies. Young children, in particular, are naturally curious and may intentionally put shiny objects, such as coins or button batteries, into their mouths. They also like to insert objects into their ear canals and nostrils. The severity of a foreign body can range from unconcerning to a life-threatening emergency. For example, a coin causes local pressure on the tissue but generally is not a medical emergency to remove. A button battery, which can be a very similar size to a coin, generates hydroxide ions at the anode and causes a chemical burn in two hours. An ingested button battery that is stuck in the esophagus is a medical emergency. In 2009, Avolio Luigi and Martucciello Giuseppe showed that although ingested nonmagnetic foreign bodies are likely to be passed spontaneously without consequence, ingested magnets (magnetic toys) may attract each other through children's intestinal walls and cause severe damage, such as pressure necrosis, perforation, intestinal fistulas, volvulus, and obstruction.

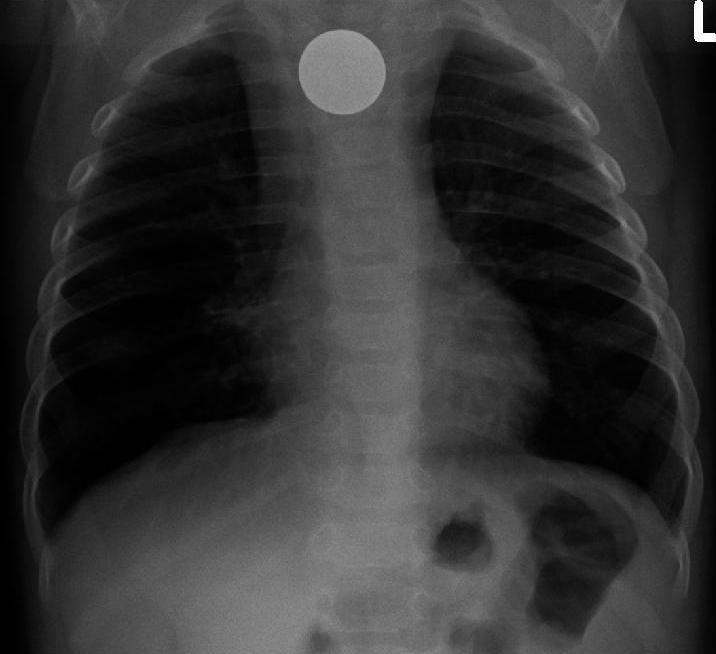
A coin seen on AP CXR in the esophagus

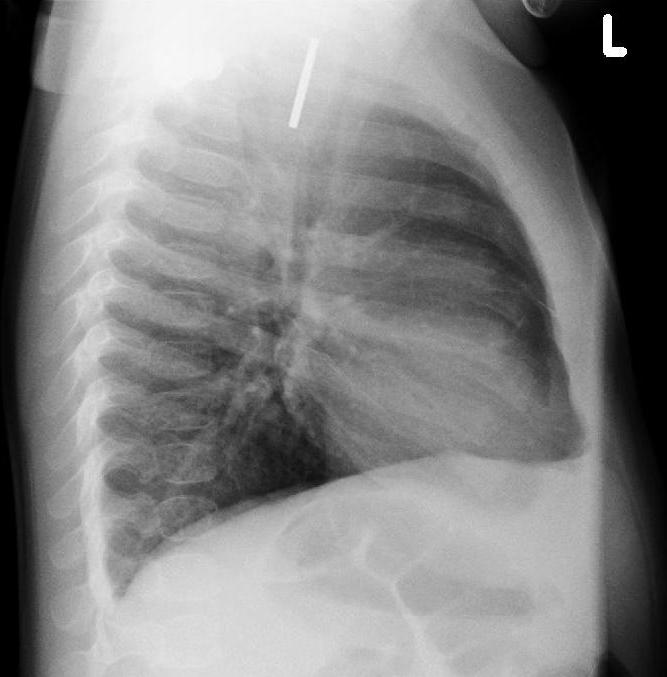
A coin seen on lateral CXR in the esophagus

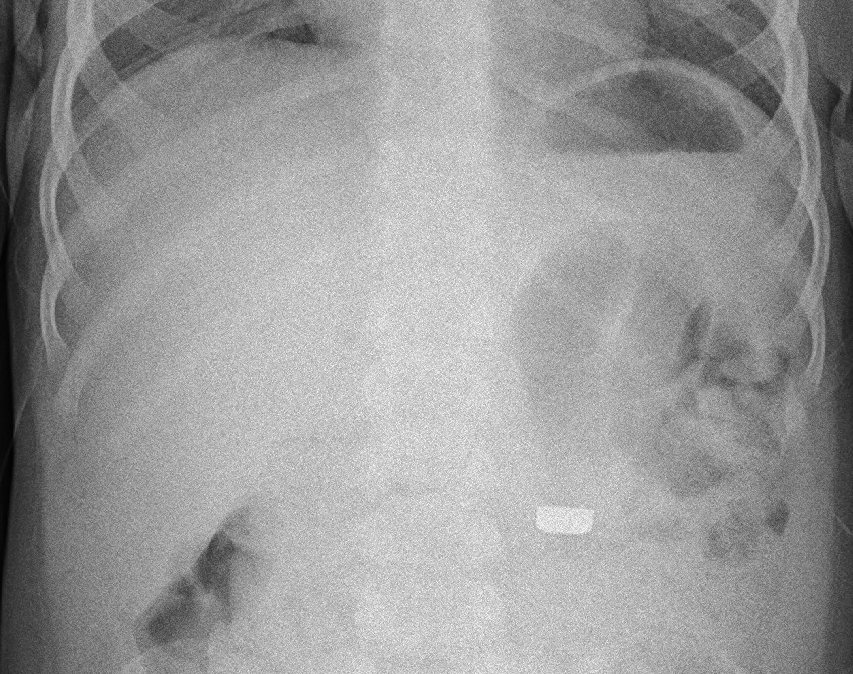
AP X ray showing a 9V battery in the intestines

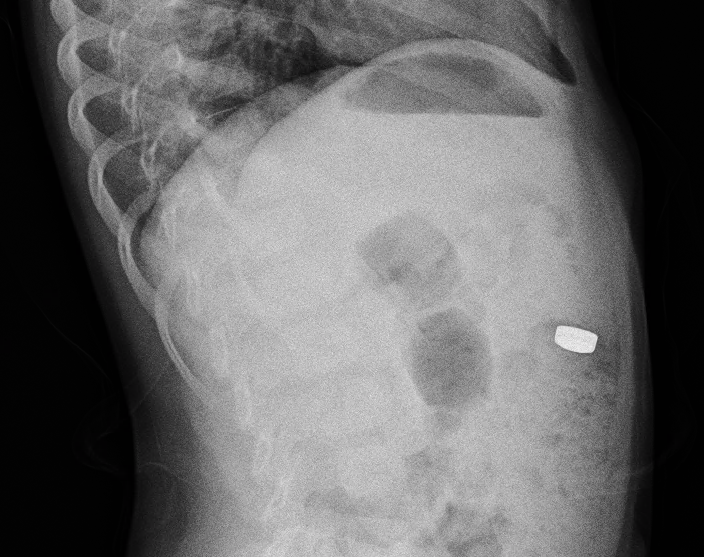
Lateral X ray showing a 9V battery in the intestines

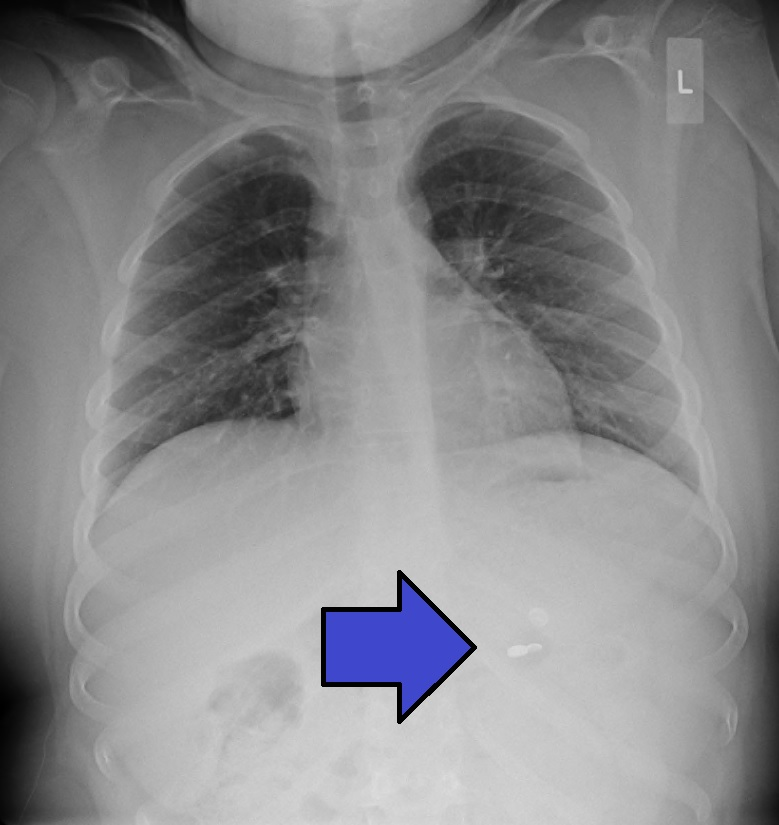
Multiple button batteries in the stomach

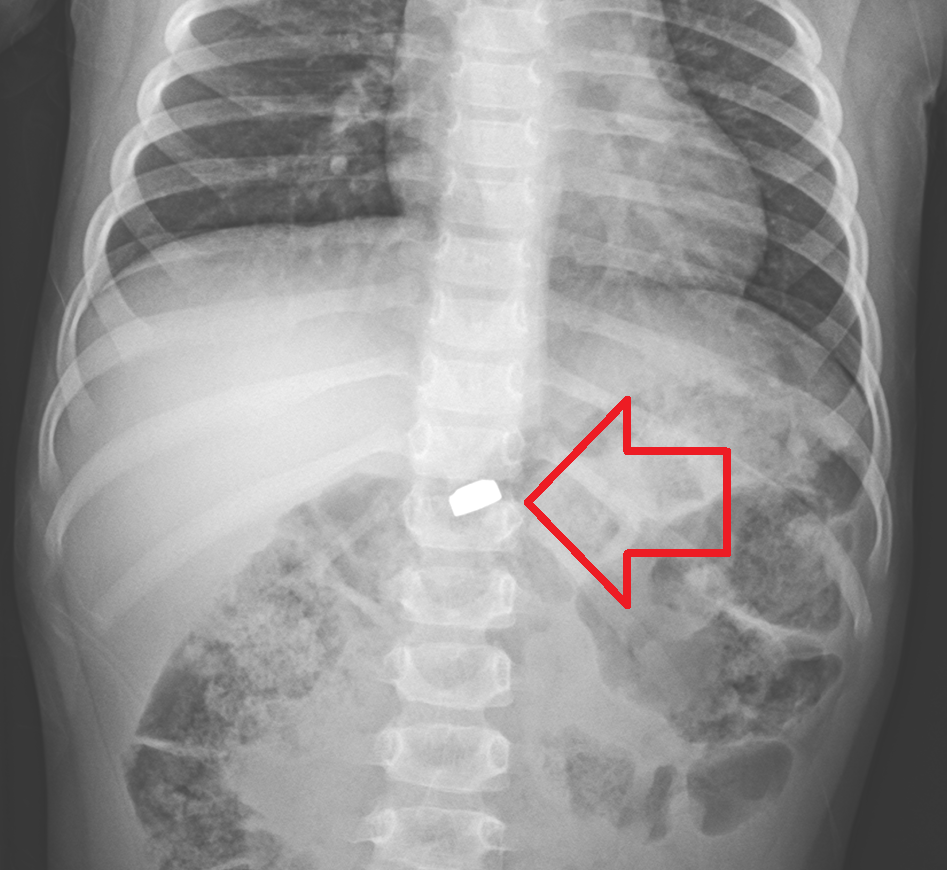
Button battery in the stomach

== Pancreas ==
Sometimes foreign bodies can pass spontaneously through the gastrointestinal tract and perforate or penetrate the wall of stomach and duodenum and migrate into the pancreas. The laparoscopic approach before open surgery could be performed safely for the removal of foreign bodies embedded in the pancreas.

== Airways ==
It is possible for a foreign body to enter the airways and cause choking. A choking case can require the fast usage of basic anti-choking techniques to clear the airway.

In one study, peanuts were the most common obstruction. In addition to peanuts, hot dogs, grapes, and latex balloons are also serious choking hazards in children that can result in death. A latex balloon will conform to the shape of the trachea, blocking the airway and making it difficult to expel with basic anti-choking techniques.

== Eyes ==
Airborne particles can lodge in the eyes of people at any age. These foreign bodies often result in allergies which are either temporary or even turn into a chronic allergy. This is especially evident in the case of dust particles.

It is also possible for larger objects to lodge in the eye. The most common cause of intraocular foreign bodies is hammering. Corneal foreign bodies are often encountered due to occupational exposure and can be prevented by instituting safety eye-wear at work place.

Foreign bodies in the eye affect about 2 per 1,000 people per year.

== Skin ==
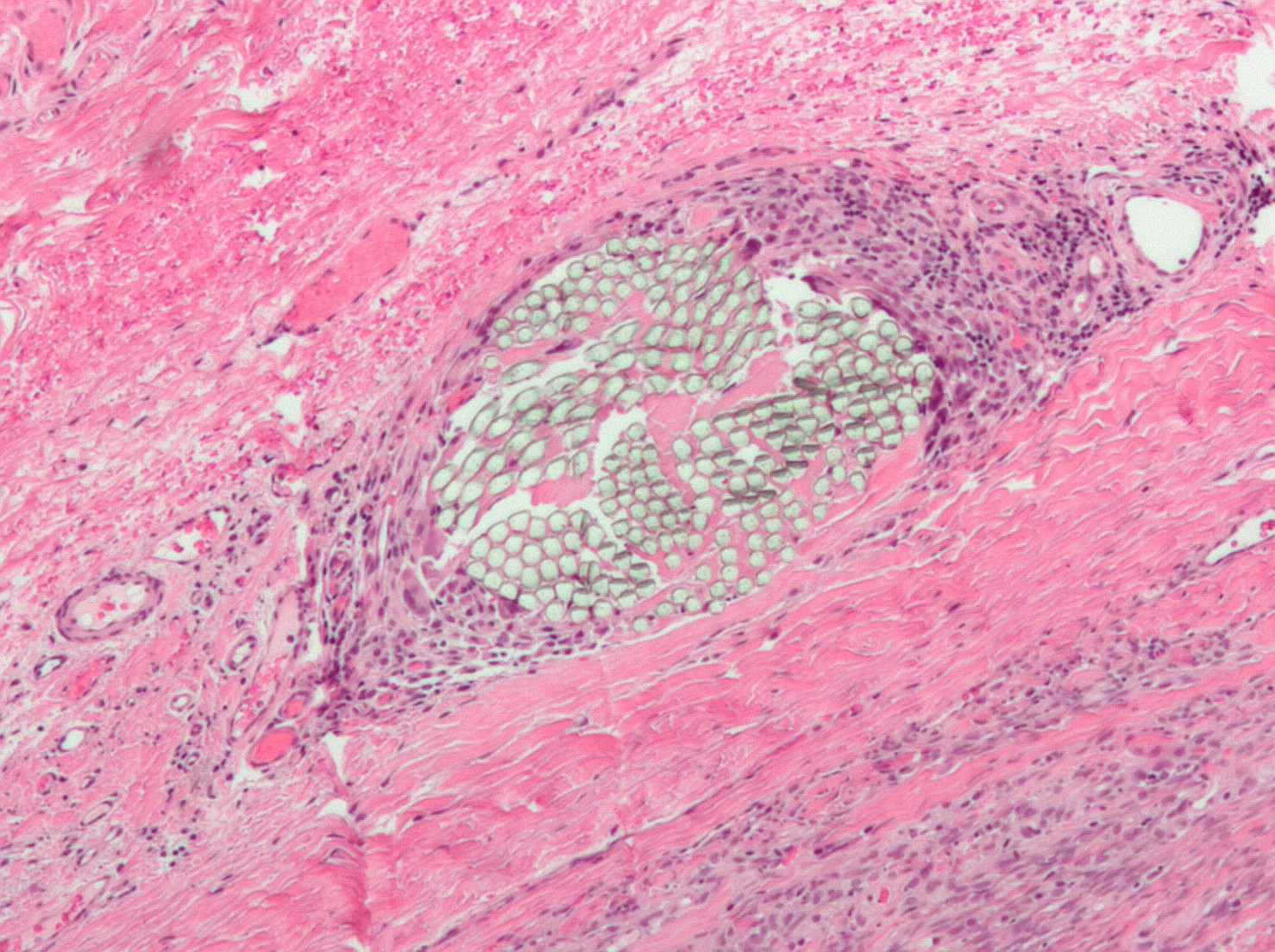
Surgical suture. H&E stain.

Splinters are common foreign bodies in skin. Staphylococcus aureus infection often causes boils to form around them.

Tetanus prophylaxis may be appropriate.

== Peritoneum ==
Foreign bodies in the peritoneum can include retained surgical instruments after abdominal surgery. Rarely, an intrauterine device can perforate the uterine wall and enter the peritoneum.

Foreign bodies in the peritoneum eventually become contained in a foreign body granuloma. In the extremely rare case of retained ectopic pregnancy, this forms a lithopedion, which involves the fetus being too large to be reabsorbed, and is calcified as a means of shielding the surrounding tissue from infection.

== Other ==
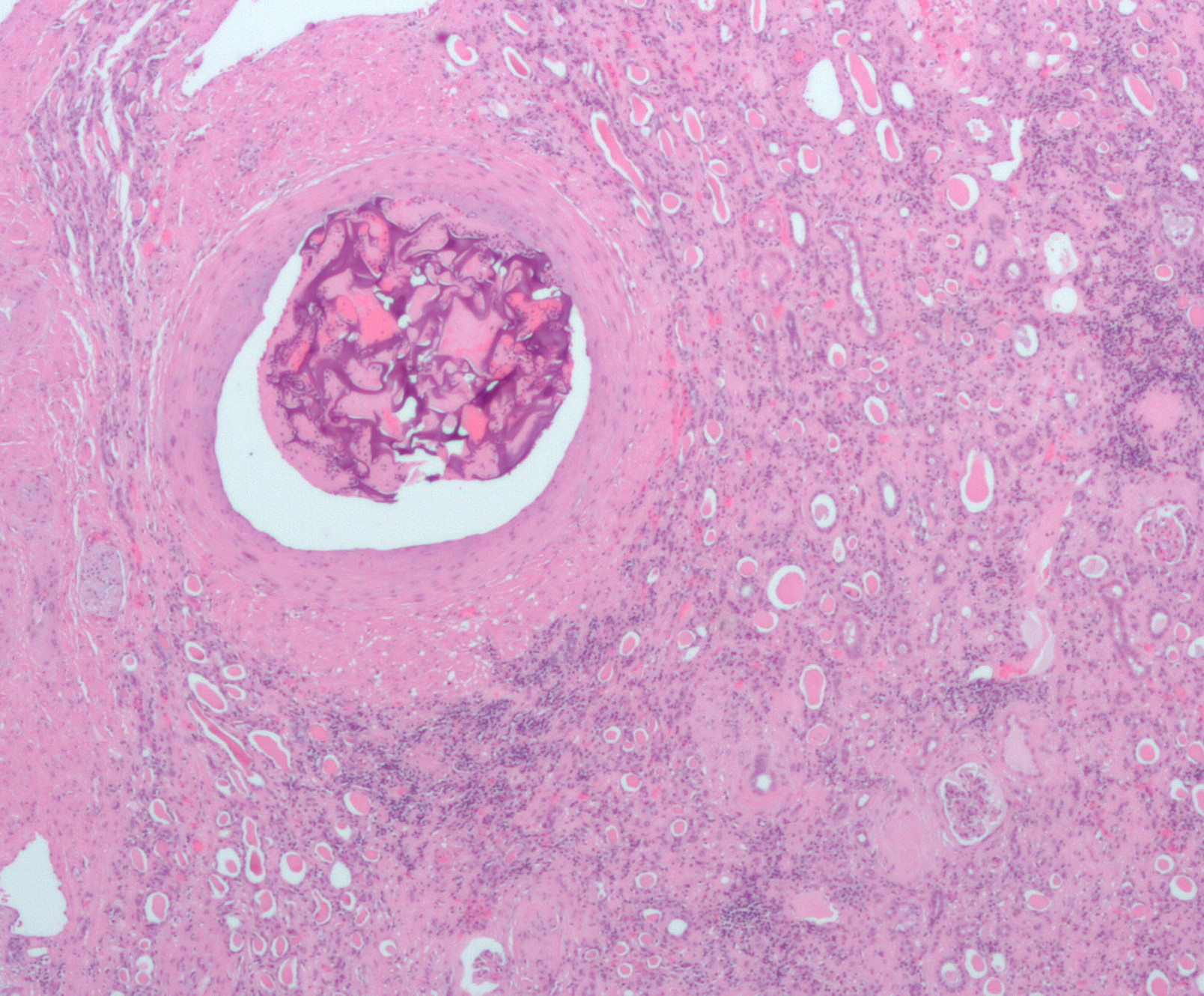
Foreign material in a blood vessel due to an embolization procedure.

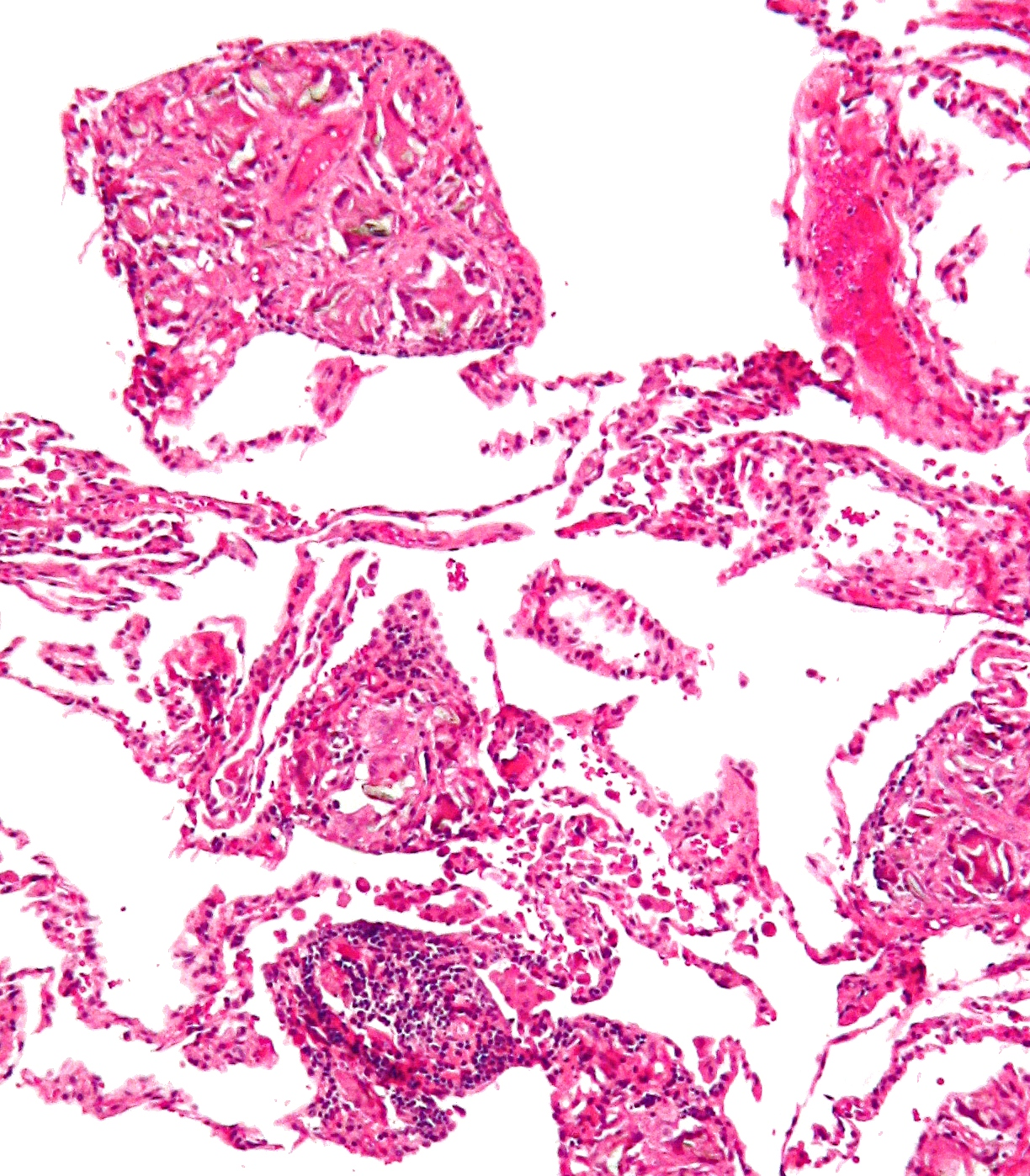
Talcosis of the lung due to intravenous drug use. H&E stain.

Foreign bodies can also become lodged in other locations:

- anus or rectum
- blood vessels or thoracic system
- ears
- nose
- teeth and periodontium
- urethra
- vagina

== Other animals ==
Foreign bodies are common in animals, especially young dogs and cats. Dogs will readily eat toys, bones, and any object that either has food on it or retains the odor of food. Dogs are more susceptible to gastrointestinal obstruction than humans due to their ability to swallow relatively large objects and pass them through the esophagus. Foreign bodies most commonly become lodged in the stomach because of the inability to pass through the pyloric sphincter into the jejunum. Symptoms of gastrointestinal obstruction include vomiting, abdominal pain often characterized by aggression, acute infection, and depression due to dehydration. Treatment of a foreign body is determined by its severity. The amount of time a foreign body is present, location of the object, degree of obstruction, previous health status of the animal and the type of material from which the foreign body is made can all determine the severity of the condition. Peritonitis results if either the stomach or intestine has ruptured. Foreign bodies in the stomach can sometimes be removed by endoscopic retrieval or if necessary by gastrotomy. Very often, a simple instrument to remove foreign bodies without operation endoscopy is the Hartmann alligator forceps. The instrument is manufactured from 8 cm to 1 m length. Foreign bodies in the jejunum are removed by enterotomy.

Certain foreign bodies in animals are especially problematic. Bones or objects with sharp edges may cause tearing of the wall of the esophagus, stomach, or small intestine and lead to peritonitis. Pennies swallowed in large numbers may cause zinc poisoning, which in dogs leads to severe gastroenteritis and hemolytic anemia. Linear foreign bodies can especially be dangerous. A linear foreign body is usually a length of string or yarn with a larger object or clump of material at either end. One end is usually lodged in the stomach or proximal small intestine and the other end continues to travel through the intestines. The material becomes tightly stretched and the intestines may "accordion up" on themselves or be lacerated by it. This is especially common in cats who may enjoy playing with a ball of string or yarn. Sometimes the linear foreign body anchors in the mouth by catching under the tongue. Pantyhose is a common linear foreign body in dogs.

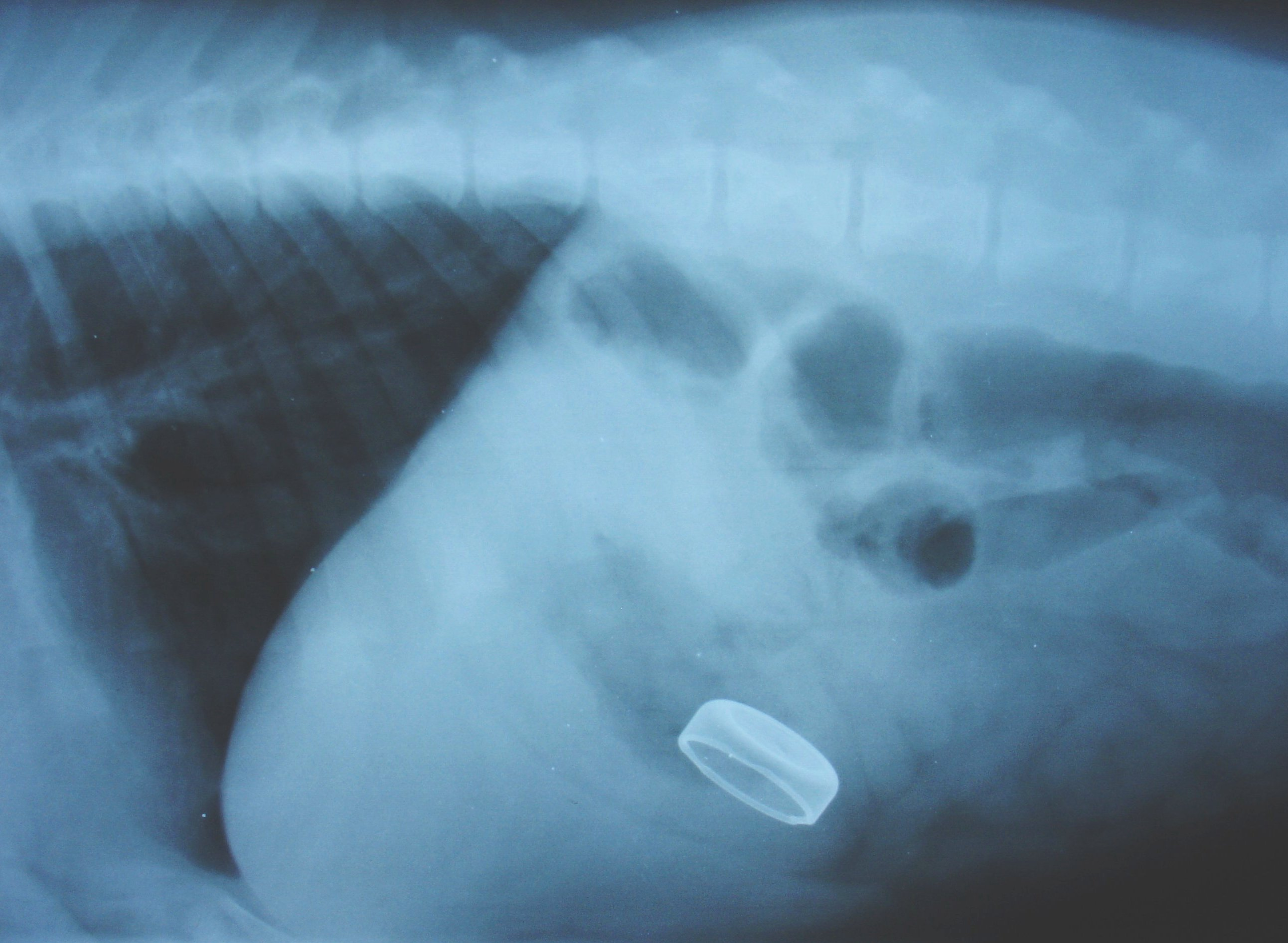
Bottle top swallowed by a dog

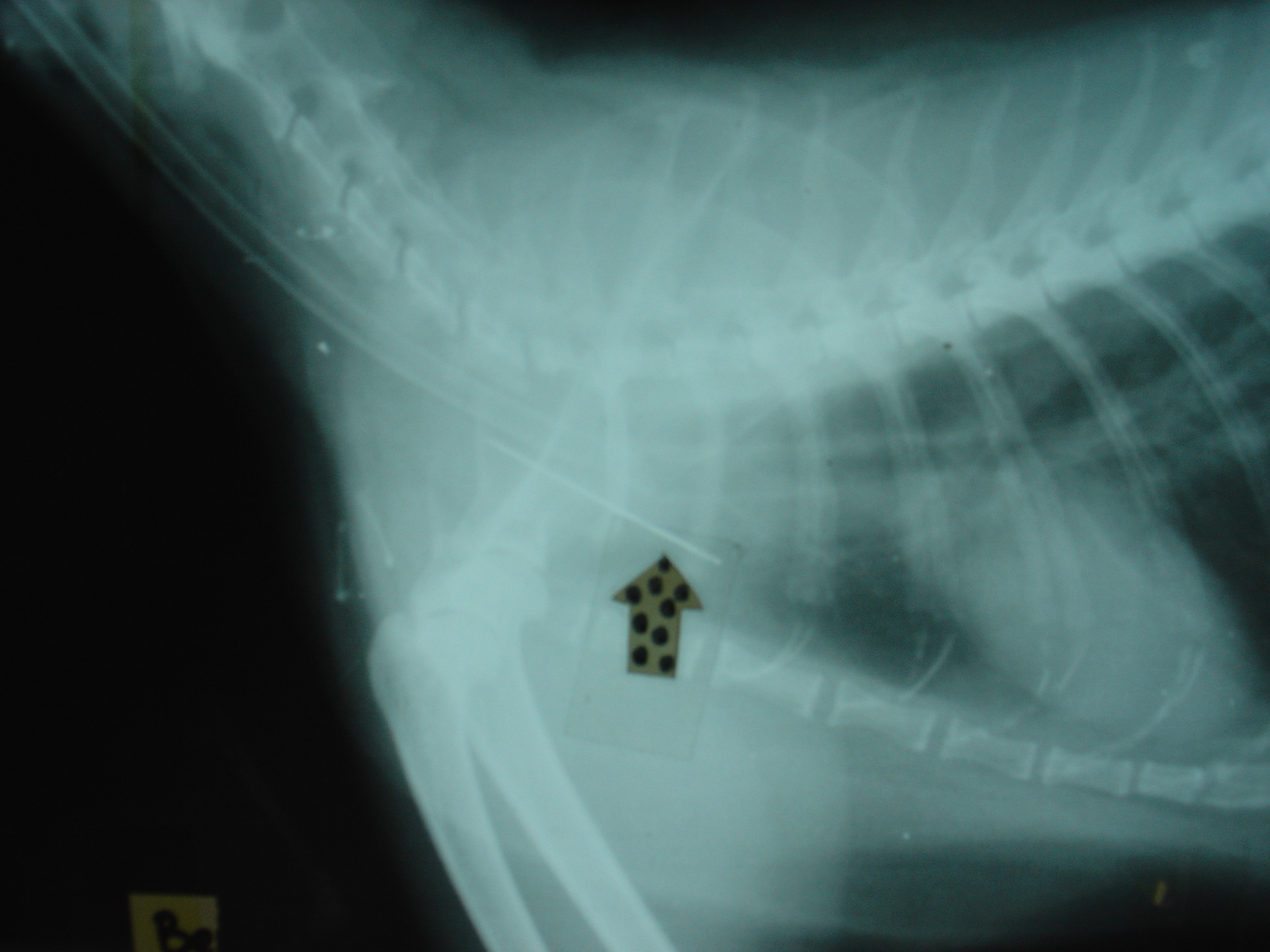
Needle swallowed by a cat

== See also ==
- Nanomaterials
- Particulates
- Xenobiotic
