= Foreign body aspiration =

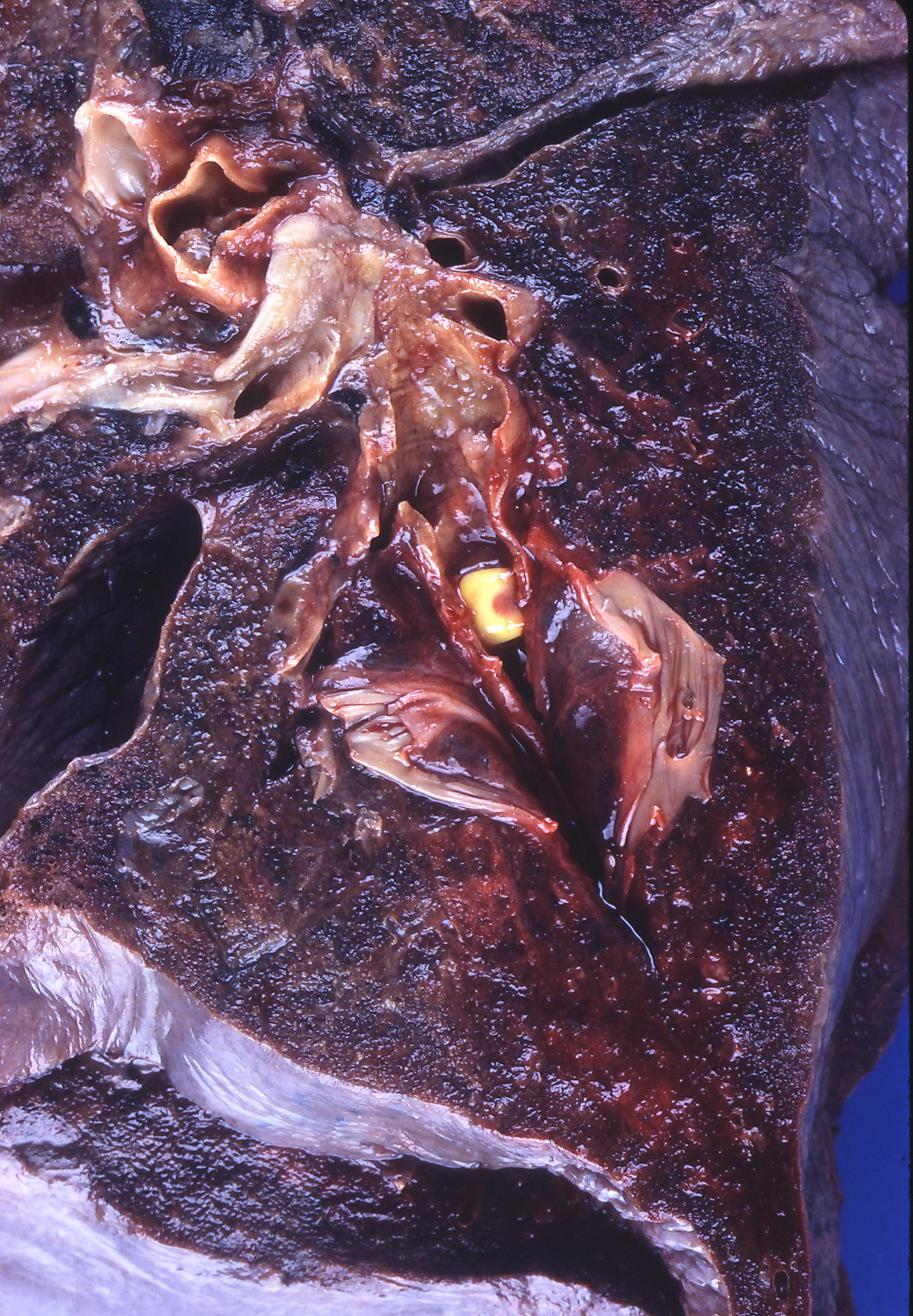
- Aspiration of corn kernel that became lodged in the airway of an adult patient.
- Specialty: Respirology
- Symptoms: Fever, choking, sore throat, drooling, stridor, speech difficulties, cyanosis, bronchitis, coughing, wheezing
- Complications: Pulmonary aspiration, blockage, pneumonia, respiratory failure, respiratory infection, cardiopulmonary arrest, pulmonary embolism, pulmonary hemorrhage
- Usual onset: Sudden or gradual
- Risk factors: Children ages 3 and lower, alcoholism, drug abuse, senility, Parkinson's disease, improper eating habits, chest trauma, neck trauma, Alzheimer's disease
- Differential diagnosis: Asthma, COPD, lung cancer, poisoning, drug overdose, cyanide poisoning, epileptic seizures, esophageal cancer, laryngeal cancer

Foreign body aspiration occurs when a foreign body enters the airway which can cause difficulty breathing or choking. Objects may reach the respiratory tract and the digestive tract from the mouth and nose, but when an object enters the respiratory tract it is termed aspiration. The foreign body can then become lodged in the trachea or further down the respiratory tract such as in a bronchus. Regardless of the type of object, any aspiration can be a life-threatening situation and requires timely recognition and action to minimize risk of complications. While advances have been made in management of this condition leading to significantly improved clinical outcomes, there were still 2,700 deaths resulting from foreign body aspiration in 2018. Approximately one child dies every five days due to choking on food in the United States, highlighting the need for improvements in education and prevention.

== Signs and symptoms ==
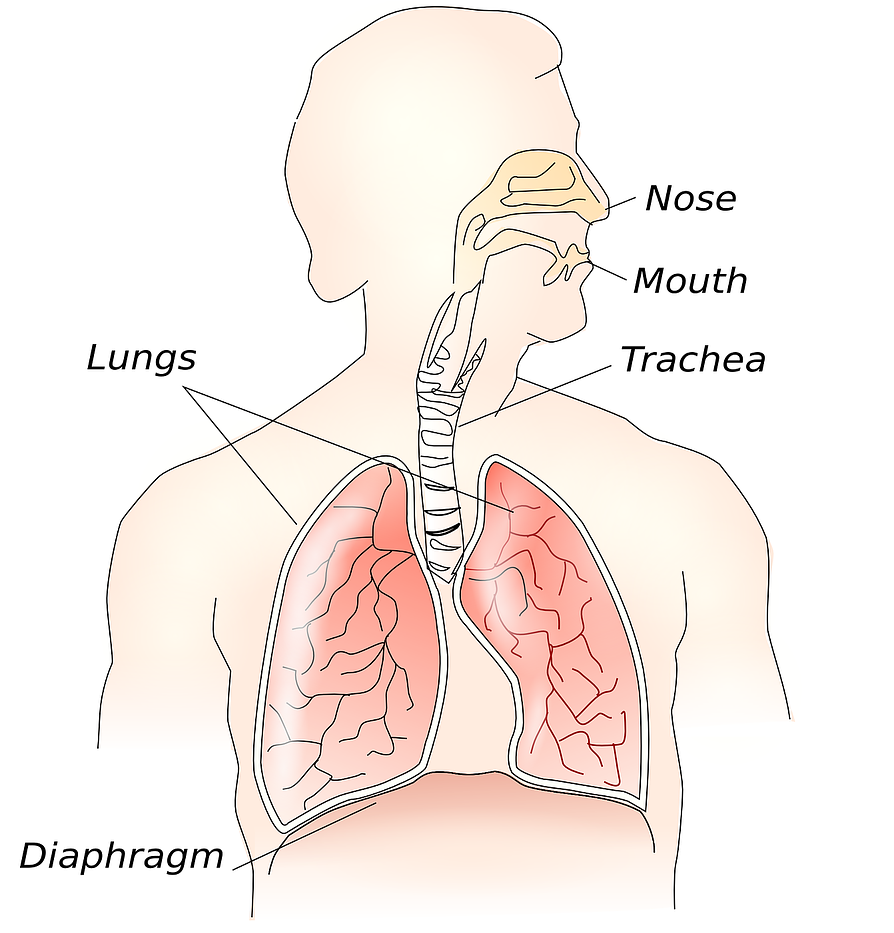
Basic human airway anatomy. Objects can enter the trachea and lungs via the mouth or nose.

Signs and symptoms of foreign body aspiration vary based on the site of obstruction, the size of the foreign body, and the severity of obstruction. 20% of foreign bodies become lodged in the upper airway, while 80% become lodged in a bronchus. Signs of foreign body aspiration are usually abrupt in onset and can involve coughing, choking, and/or wheezing; however, symptoms can be slower in onset if the foreign body does not cause a large degree of obstruction of the airway. With this said, aspiration can also be asymptomatic on rare occasions.

Classically, patients present with acute onset of choking. In these cases, the obstruction is classified as a partial or complete obstruction. Signs of partial obstruction include choking with drooling, stridor, and the patient maintains the ability to speak. Signs of complete obstruction include choking with inability to speak or absence of bilateral breath sounds among other signs of respiratory distress such as cyanosis. A fever may be present. When this is the case, it is possible the object may be chemically irritating or contaminated.

Foreign bodies above the larynx often present with stridor, while objects below the larynx present with wheezing. Foreign bodies above the vocal cords often present with difficulty and pain with swallowing and excessive drooling. Foreign bodies below the vocal cords often present with pain and difficulty with speaking and breathing. Increased respiratory rate may be the only sign of foreign body aspiration in a child who cannot verbalize or report if they have swallowed a foreign body.

If the foreign body does not cause a large degree of obstruction, patients may present with chronic cough, asymmetrical breath sounds on exam, or recurrent pneumonia of a specific lung lobe. If the aspiration occurred weeks or even months ago, the object may lead to an obstructive pneumonia or even a lung abscess. Therefore, it is important to consider chronic foreign body aspiration in patients whose histories include unexplained recurrent pneumonia or lung abscess with or without fever.

In adults, the right lower lobe of the lung is the most common site of recurrent pneumonia in foreign body aspiration. This is due to the fact that the anatomy of the right main bronchus is wider and steeper than that of the left main bronchus, allowing objects to enter more easily than the left side. Unlike adults, there is only a slight propensity towards objects lodging in the right bronchus in children. This is likely due to the bilateral bronchial angles being symmetric until about 15 years of age when the aortic knob fully develops and displaces the left main bronchus.

Signs and symptoms of foreign body aspiration in adults may also mimic other lung disorders such as asthma, COPD, and lung cancer. {

== Causes ==
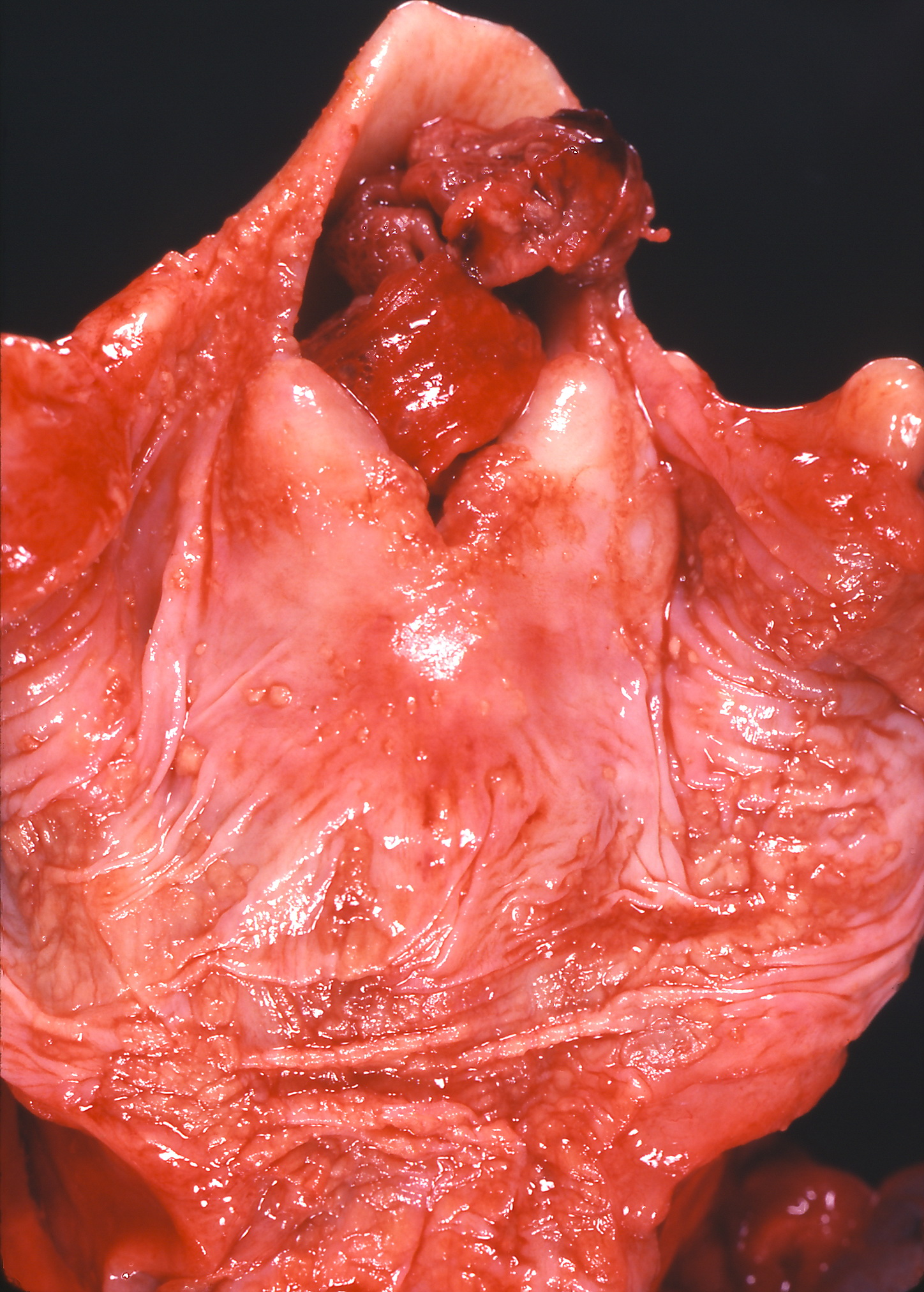
Section of larynx showing aspirated fragment of meat (top center).

Most cases of foreign body aspiration are in children ages 6 months to 3 years due to the tendency for children to place small objects in the mouth and nose. Children of this age usually lack molars and cannot grind up food into small pieces for proper swallowing. Small, round objects including nuts, hard candy, popcorn kernels, beans, and berries are common causes of foreign body aspiration. Latex balloons are also a serious choking hazard in children that can result in death. A latex balloon will conform to the shape of the trachea, blocking the airway and making it difficult to expel with the Heimlich maneuver. In addition, if the foreign body is able to absorb water, such as a bean, seed, or corn, among other things, it may swell over time leading to a more severe obstruction.

In adults, foreign body aspiration is most prevalent in populations with impaired swallowing mechanisms such as the following: neurological disorders, alcohol use, advanced age leading to senility (most common in the 6th decade of life), and loss of consciousness. This inadequate airway protection may also be attributed to poor dentition, seizure, general anesthesia, or sedative drug use.

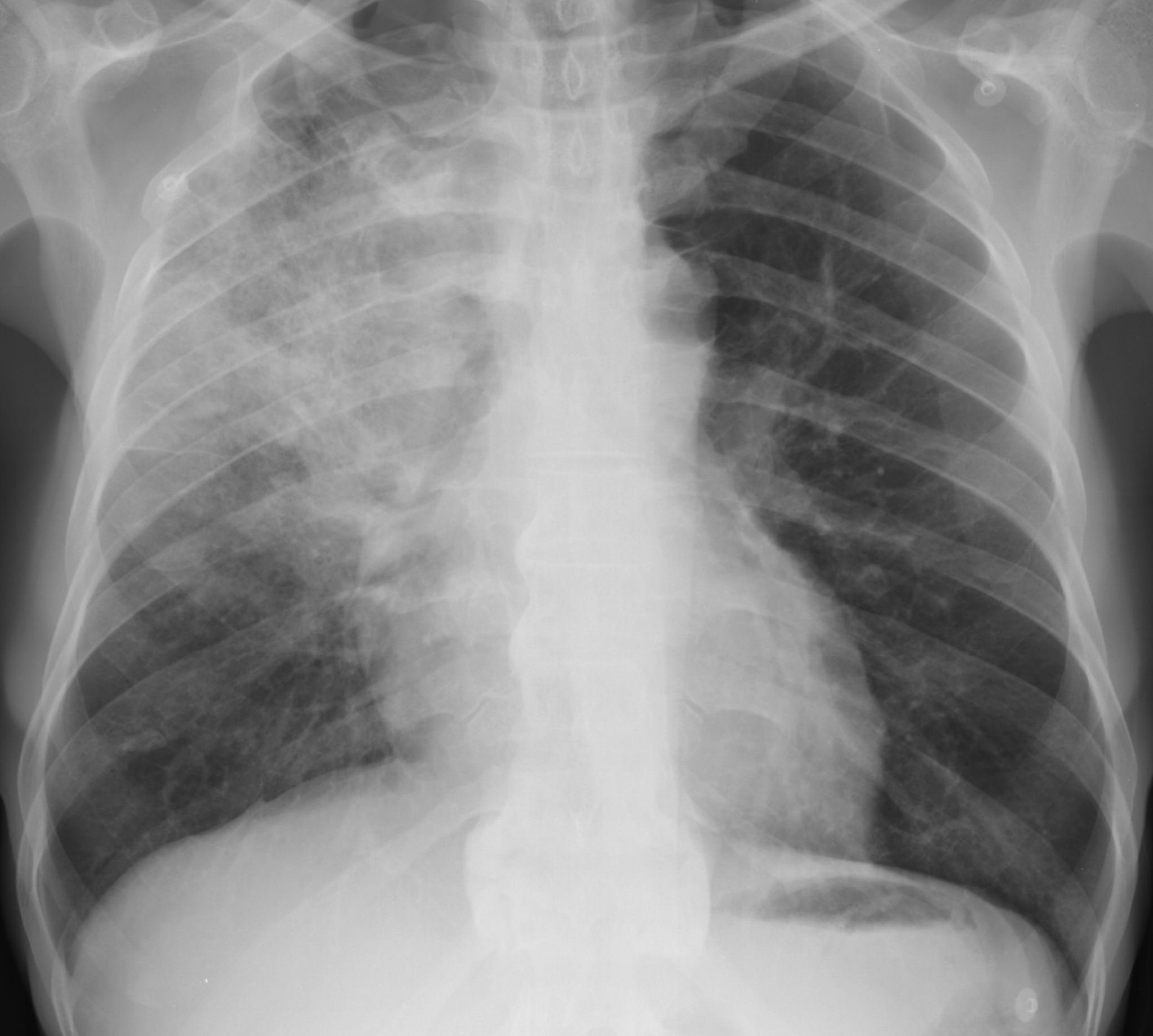
Chest x-ray of an adult with obstructive pneumonia in the right lung (left side of the image) evidenced by hypodense (less dark) area. This is from a blockage in the respiratory tract leading to an infection distal to the obstruction.

== Diagnosis ==
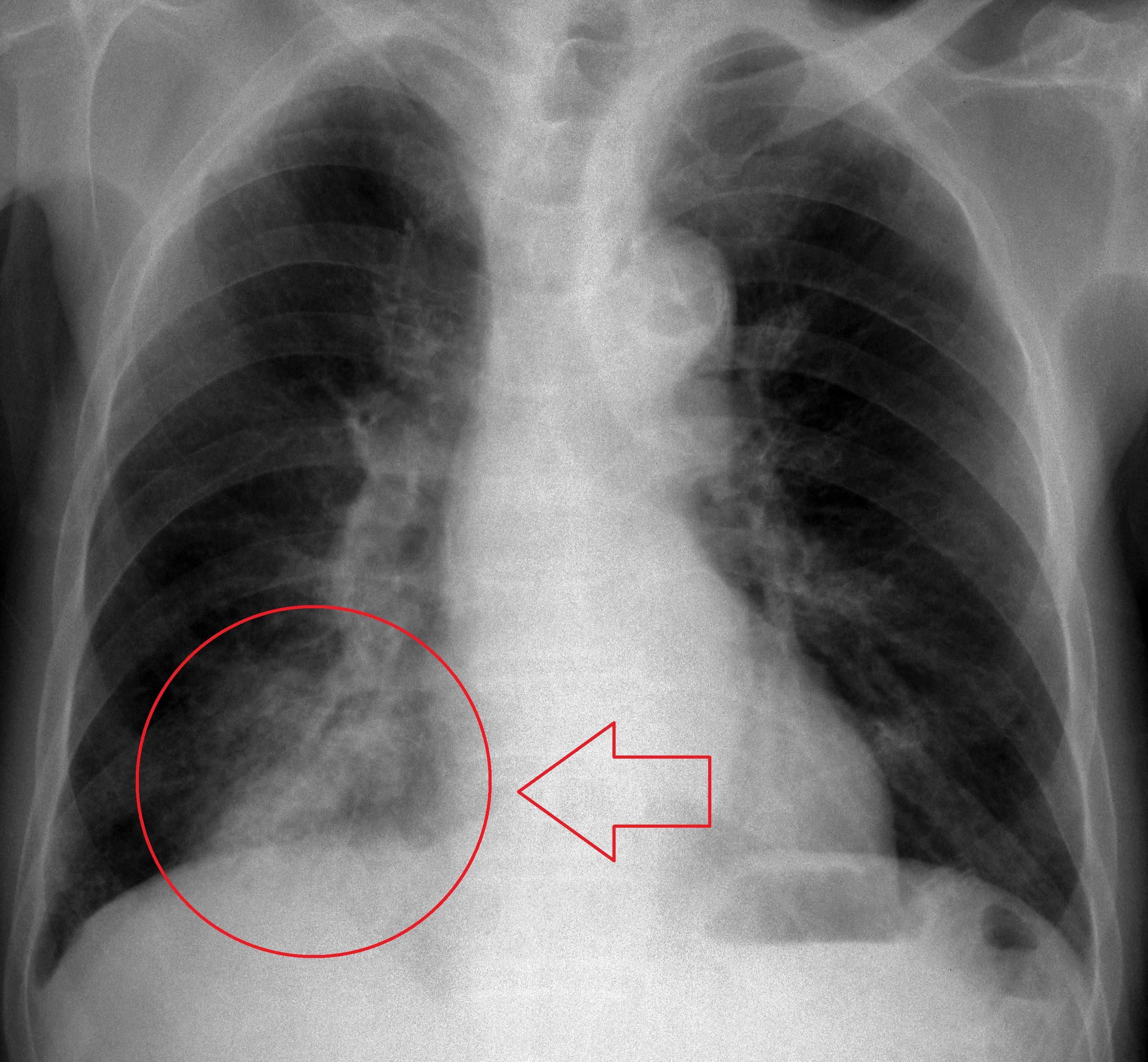
X-ray of focal pneumonia in lower right lung lobe (bottom left of chest in image) due to aspiration and airway obstruction.

The most important aspect of the assessment for a clinician is an accurate history provided by an event witness. Unfortunately, this is not always available.

=== Physical examination ===
A physical examination by a clinician should include, at a minimum, a general assessment in addition to cardiac and pulmonary exams. Auscultation of breath sounds may give additional information regarding object location and the degree of airway obstruction. The presence of drooling and dysphagia (drooling) should always be noted alongside the classic signs of airway obstruction as these can indicate involvement of the esophagus and impact management.

=== Diagnostic Imaging ===
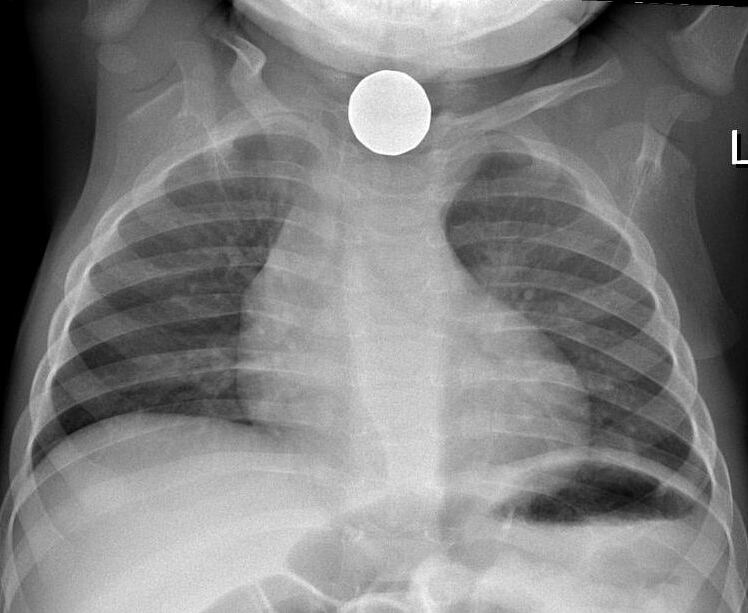
Foreign body aspiration of a coin in the esophagus.

Radiography is the most common form of imaging used in the initial assessment of a foreign body presentation. Most patients receive a chest x-ray to determine the location of the foreign body. Lateral neck, chest, and bilateral decubitus end-expiratory chest x-rays should be obtained in patients suspected of having aspirated a foreign body. However, the presence of normal findings on chest radiography should not rule out foreign body aspiration as not all objects can be visualized. In fact, up to 50% of cases can have normal findings on radiography. This is because visibility of an object depends on many factors, such as the object's material, size, anatomic location and surrounding structures, as well as the patient's body habitus. X-ray beams only show an object if that object's composition blocks the rays from traveling through, making it radiopaque and appearing lighter or white on the image. This also requires it to not be stuck behind something that blocks the beams first. Objects that are radiopaque include items made of most metals except aluminum, bones except most fish bones, and glass. If the material does not block the x-ray beams it is considered radiolucent and will appear dark which prevents visualization. This includes material such as most plastics, most fish bones, wood, and most aluminum objects.

Other diagnostic imaging modalities, such as magnetic resonance imaging, computed tomography, and ventilation perfusion scans play a limited role in the diagnosis of foreign body aspiration.

Signs on x-ray that are more commonly seen than the object itself and can be indicative of foreign body aspiration include visualization of the foreign body or hyperinflation of the affected lung. Other x-ray findings that can be seen with foreign body aspiration include obstructive emphysema, atelectasis, and consolidation.

While, x-ray can be used to visualize the location and identity of a foreign body, rigid bronchoscopy under general anesthesia is the gold-standard for diagnosis since the foreign body can be visualized and removed with this intervention. Rigid bronchoscopy is indicated when two of the three following criteria are met: report of foreign body aspiration by the patient or a witness, abnormal lung exam findings, or abnormal chest x-ray findings.

== Management ==
See also: Choking § Treatment, Basic Life Support, Advanced Cardiovascular Life Support

Treatment of foreign body aspiration is determined by the age of the patient and the severity of obstruction of the airway involved.

=== Basic management ===
An airway obstruction can be partial or complete. In partial obstruction, the patient can usually clear the foreign body with coughing. In complete obstruction, acute intervention is required to remove the foreign body.

If foreign body aspiration is suspected, finger sweeping in the mouth is not recommended due to the increased risk of displacing the foreign object further into the airway.

For choking children less than 1 year of age, the child should be placed face down over the rescuer's arm. Back blows should be delivered with the heel of the hand, then the patient should be turned face-up and chest thrusts should be administered. The rescuer should alternate five back blows followed by five chest thrusts until the object is cleared. The Heimlich maneuver should be used in choking patients older than 1 year of age to dislodge a foreign body. If the patient becomes unresponsive during physical intervention, cardiopulmonary resuscitation (CPR) should be started.

=== Advanced management ===
In the event that the basic measures do not remove the foreign body, and adequate ventilation cannot be restored, need for treatment by trained personnel becomes necessary. Laryngoscopy should be performed in unresponsive patients if non-invasive airway clearance techniques are unsuccessful. Laryngoscopy involves placing a device in the mouth to visualize the back of the airway. If the foreign body can be seen, it can be removed with forceps. An endotracheal tube should then be placed in order to prevent airway compromise from resulting inflammation after the procedure. If the foreign body cannot be visualized, intubation, tracheotomy, or needle cricothyrotomy can be done to restore an airway for patients who have become unresponsive due to airway compromise.

If non-invasive measures do not dislodge the foreign body, and the patient can maintain adequate ventilation, rigid bronchoscopy under general anesthesia should be performed. Supplemental oxygen, cardiac monitoring, and a pulse oximeter should be applied to the patient. Efforts should be made to keep the patient calm and avoid agitating the patient to prevent further airway compromise. Flexible rather than rigid bronchoscopy might be used when the diagnosis or object location are unclear. When flexible bronchoscope is used, rigid bronchoscope is typically on standby and readily available as this is the preferred approach for removal. Rigid bronchoscopy allows good airway control, ready bleeding management, better visualization, and ability to manipulate the aspirated object with a variety of forceps. Flexible bronchoscopy may be used for extraction when distal access is needed and the operator is experienced in this technique. Potential advantages include avoidance of general anesthesia as well as the ability to reach subsegmental bronchi which are smaller in diameter and further down the respiratory tract than the main bronchi. The main disadvantage of using a flexible scope is the risk of further dislodging the object and causing airway compromise. Bronchoscopy is successful in removing the foreign body in approximately 95% of cases with a complication rate of only 1%.

After the foreign body is removed, patients should receive nebulized beta-adrenergic medication and chest physiotherapy to further protect the airway. Steroidal anti-inflammatories and antibiotics are not routinely administered except in certain scenarios. These include situations such as when the foreign body is difficult or impossible to extract, when there is a documented respiratory tract infection, and when swelling within the airway occurs after removal of the object. Glucocorticoids may be administered when the foreign body is surrounded by inflamed tissue and extraction is difficult or impossible. In such cases, extraction may be delayed for a short course of glucocorticoids so that the inflammation may be reduced before subsequent attempts. These patients should remain under observation in the hospital until successful extraction as this practice can result in dislodgement of the foreign body. Antibiotics are appropriate when an infection has developed but should not delay extraction. In fact, removal of the object may improve infection control by removing the infectious source as well as using cultures taken during the bronchoscopy to guide antibiotic choice. When airway edema or swelling occur, the patient may have stridor. In these cases, glucocorticoids, aerosolized epinephrine, or helium oxygen therapy may be considered as part of the management plan.

Patients who are clinically stable with no need for supplemental oxygen after extraction may be discharged from the hospital the same day as the procedure. Routine imaging such as a follow-up chest x-ray are not needed unless symptoms persist or worsen, or if the patient had imaging abnormalities previously to verify return to normal. Most children are discharged within 24 hours of the procedure.

== Complications ==
Many complications can develop if a foreign body remains in the airway. There are also complications that may occur after removal of the object depending on the timeline of events. Cardiac arrest and death are possible complications if a sudden complete obstruction occurs and immediate medical care is not performed. The most common complication from a foreign body aspiration is a pulmonary infection, such as pneumonia or a lung abscess. This can be more difficult to overcome in the elderly population and lead to even further complications. Patients may develop inflammation of the airway walls from a foreign body remaining in the airway. Airway secretions can be retained behind the obstruction which creates an ideal environment for subsequent bacterial overgrowth. Hyperinflation of the airway distal to the obstruction can also occur if the foreign body is not removed. Episodes of recurrent pneumonia in the same lung field should prompt evaluation for a possible foreign body in the airway.

Whether or not the foreign body is removed, complications such as chemical bronchitis, mucosal reactions, and the development of granulation tissue are possible.

Complications can also arise from interventions used to remove a foreign body from the airway. Rigid bronchoscopy is the gold standard for removal of a foreign body, however this intervention does have potential risks. The most common complication from rigid bronchoscopy is damage to the patient's teeth. Other less common complications include cuts to the mouth or esophagus, perforation of the bronchial tree, damage to the vocal cords, pneumothorax, atelectasis, stricture, and perforation.

== Prevention ==
There are many factors to consider when determining how to decrease the likelihood of aspiration, especially in the extremely young and elderly populations.

The major considerations in children are their developmental level in terms of swallowing and protecting their airway via mechanisms such as coughing and the gag reflex. Also, certain object characteristics such as size, shape, and material can increase their potential to cause choking among children. When there are multiple children in a shared environment, toys and foods that are acceptable for older children often pose a choking risk to the younger children. Education for parents and caretakers should continue to be prioritized when possible. This can be through positions such as pediatricians, dentists, and school teachers as well as media advertisements and printed materials. This education should include educating caretakers on how to recognize choking and perform first aid and cardiopulmonary resuscitation, check for warning labels and toy recalls, and avoid high risk objects and foods.

Thanks to numerous public advancements, such as the Child Safety Protection Act and the Federal Hazardous Substance Act (FHSA), warning labels for choking hazards are required on packaging for small balls, marbles, balloons, and toys with small parts when these are intended for use by children in at-risk age groups. Also, the Consumer Product Safety Improvement Act of 2008 amended the FHSA to also require advertisements on websites, catalogues, and other printed materials to include the choking hazard warnings.
