= Hartmann alligator forceps =

Medical instrument

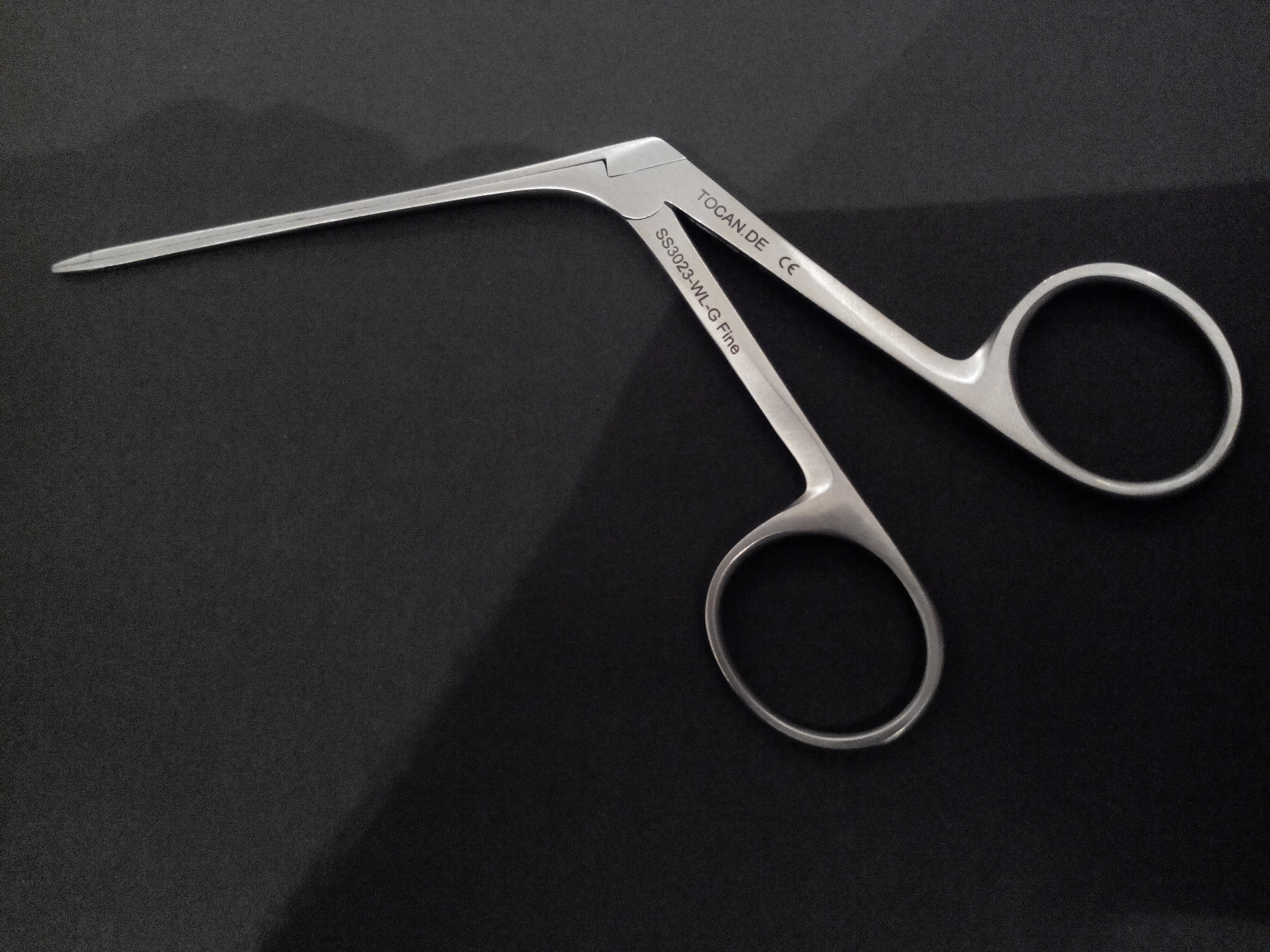
Hartmann alligator forceps, 8 cm / 3,14 inch, fine

Hartmann Alligator Forceps functionality

The Hartmann alligator forceps or Hartmann foreign body forceps, named after the German physician Arthur Hartmann, are medical forceps for removing foreign bodies. It is used in addition to surgery mainly in otorhinolaryngology (ENT). Their quality depends on the origin and quality of the stainless steel. Indian steel is used often for hobbyist use. FDA and CE certified instruments also veterinary instruments are normally made of Japanese or German steel.

== Shaft length ==
The shaft length varies up to one meter, is predominantly 8 to 12 cm. Only the top mouth opens alligator-like. (in US therefore has the medical term "Alligator Mouth" or "Hartmann Alligator Forceps" enforced. A common name also is "Crocodile forceps"). The standard length of the muzzle from the front hinge implementation is 1.5 cm or 1 cm. Thus, the clamp is used where normal tweezers or fine instruments are struggling to grasp small objects. So you can even grasp objects in small tubes and position them precisely.

== Clamp ==
The ear clamp is used wherever problems exist with normal tweezers or fine instruments to grasp small objects. It opens only a small part of the mouth. So you can even grasp objects in small tubes and position them precisely. Ideal during soldering, when it is difficult to accurately position small components. In veterinary medicine the Hartmann, ear polypus forceps is used to remove awns or epilate hairs of dogs ears. The design reduces the natural tremor (shaking).
