= Grand Théâtre de Genève =

Opera house in Geneva, Switzerland

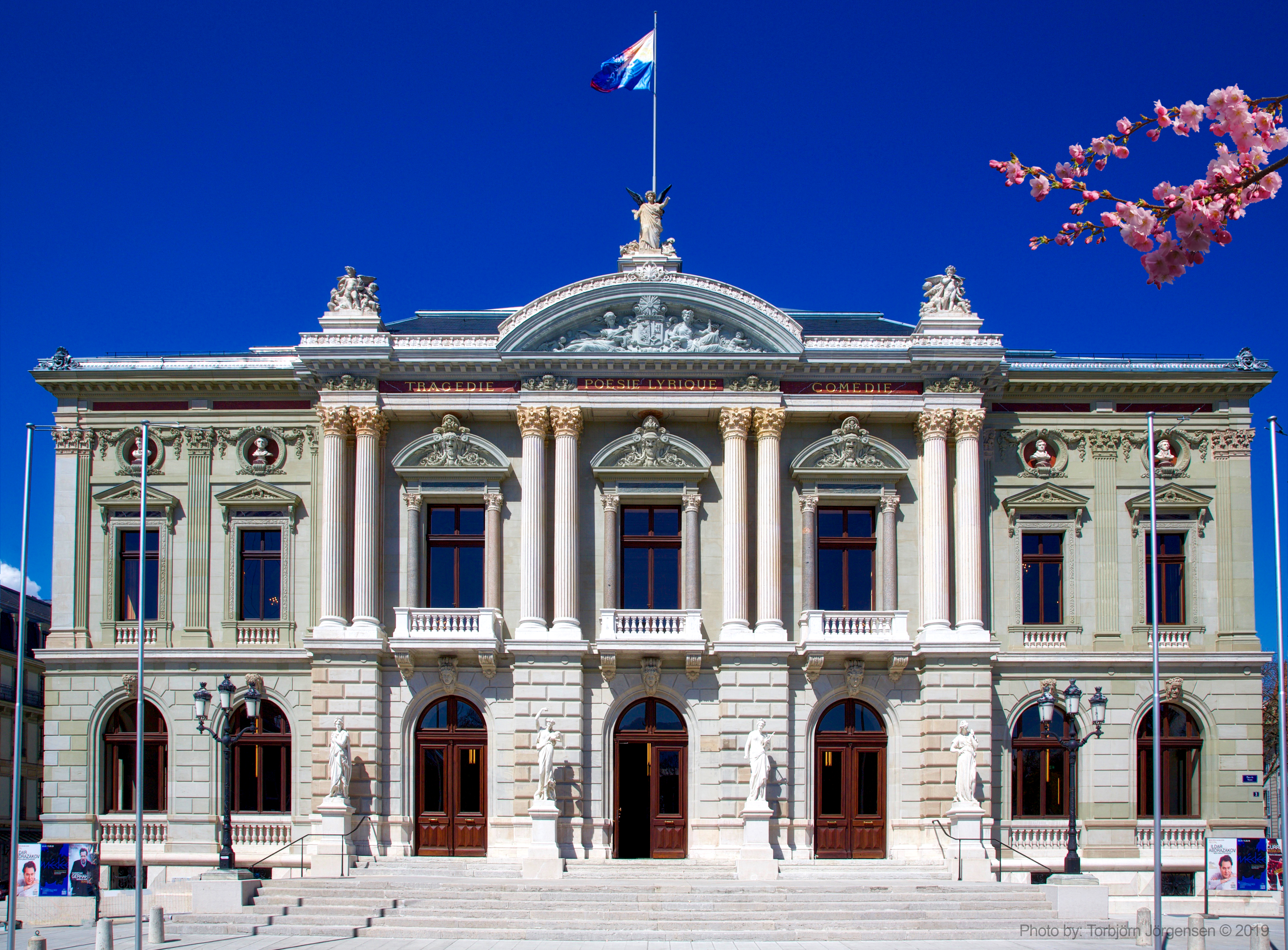
- Interactive map of Grand Théâtre de Genève
- Location: Geneva, Switzerland
- Coordinates: 46°12′06″N 6°08′34″E

Construction
- Opened: 1879

Website
- Official website

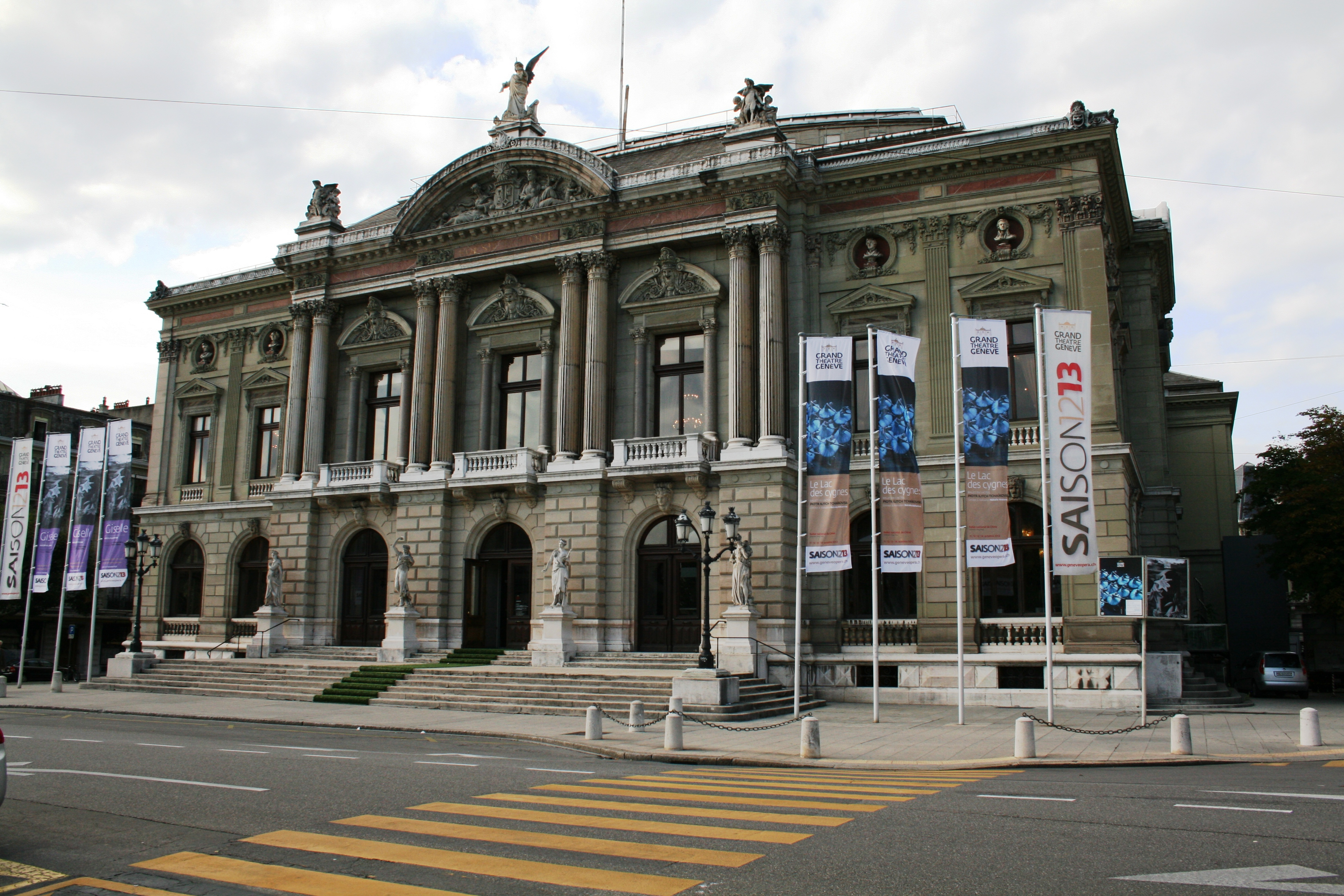
Front Façade

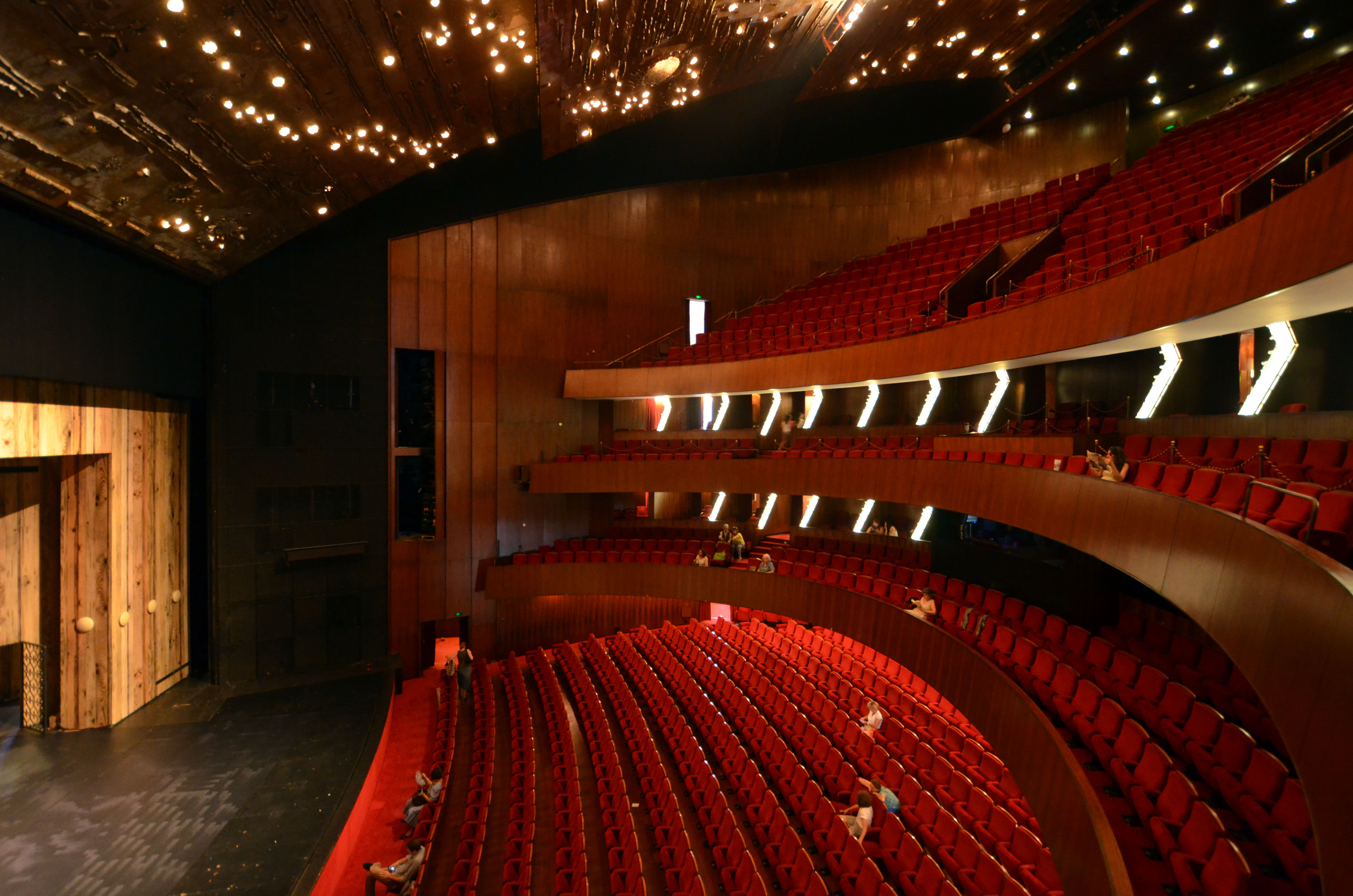
Auditorium

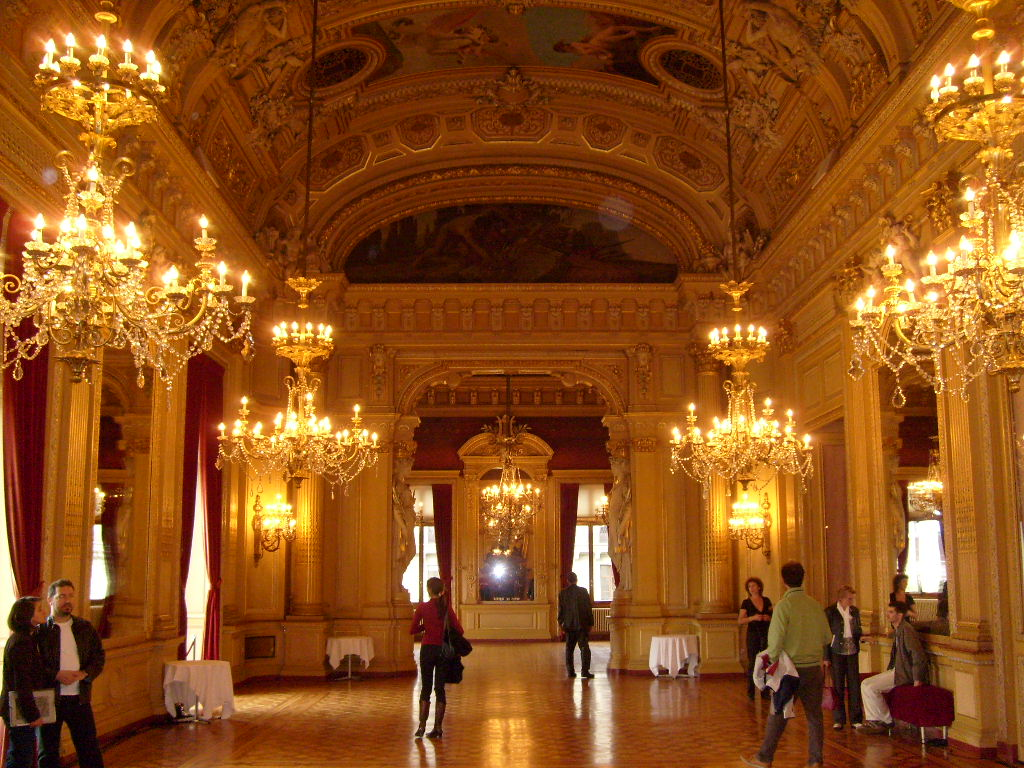
Grand Foyer

Grand Théâtre de Genève is an opera house in Geneva, Switzerland.

The venue was officially opened in 1876, partly destroyed by fire in 1951 and reopened in 1962, after extensive refurbishments. It houses the largest stage in Switzerland. As an institution, it is the largest production and host theatre in French-speaking Switzerland, featuring opera and dance performances, recitals, concerts and, occasionally, theatre.

During the 17th and early 18th centuries, Geneva was heavily influenced by Calvinist orthodoxy and it was not until the middle 1760s that the city agreed to the building of the Théâtre de Rosimond, Geneva's first opera house. Under the influence of Voltaire, opera began to flourish at La Grange aux Etrangers and its successor theatre, the Théâtre de Neuve, both of which were located outside the walls of the city.

== The Grand Théâtre 1879–1951 ==
After a long period of uninterrupted activity, the Théâtre de Neuve was pulled down in 1880 to be replaced by a new theatre, better suited to the quality and space needed by Geneva's growing population. As early as 1862, the Municipal Council had decided that the theatre was too small and plain, in view of Geneva's increasing importance and prestige. In 1870, an invitation for proposals was launched, and the project was handed to architects Emile Reverdin and Gaspard André. Funds for the new theatre project were provided by Charles II, Duke of Brunswick's legacy to the city in 1873, out of which CHF 1.2 million were earmarked for the new theatre. The municipal government voted to begin construction of the new theatre in 1874, on a 3,000 square metre plot granted by the State of Geneva and formerly occupied by the moats of the ancient city wall, according to plans drawn up by the architect Jacques-Élysée Goss.

The first stone was laid in 1875, and the official inauguration took place in 1879 with a performance of Rossini's William Tell opening the season. The new building, placed between the Musée Rath and the Conservatory of Music, was rated among the ten best opera houses in Europe, close behind the recently completed Palais Garnier in Paris, from which it drew considerable architectural inspiration, in its Second Empire style.

The building's facades are built of freestone, with plinths of Jura limestone and the rest of the building in sandstone and molasse. On the main façade, eight large pillars of Jura limestone alternate with six smaller ones, of red granite found in the bed of a mountain river in the Bernese Oberland. The main façade features a number of sculptures and mouldings, which give it its monumental aspect. A perron leads to the front building, where marble statues representing Drama, Dance, Music, and Comedy balance the central façade. On the upper level, double columns separate the three balcony windows from the main foyer. The top of the façade features a pediment bearing the coat of arms of Geneva, crowned with an allegorical figure representing the Genius of the Arts, supported by two groups of sculptural figures. Under the entablature, eight busts decorate the main façade and its returns on the sides of the building. They represent important composers of the time: Rossini, Boieldieu, Beethoven, Meyerbeer, Weber, Mozart, and Donizetti and the famous writer—and occasionally composer—Jean-Jacques Rousseau.

When entering the vestibule, one formerly came across the box office and, on the right-hand side, the theatre café. Beyond this, a hall with a recently renovated polychrome marble floor led to the house. The two flights of stairs leading to the foyer and the upper tiers were decorated with six large-scale paintings by Léon Gaud representing six types of music: military, pastoral, religious, light, Orphic and Dionysian. These panels, of a highly academic nature, alternated with medallion portraits of famous composers. All the decorative elements of the upper vestibule (door frames leading to the balconies, ceiling panels) were lost in the great fire of 1951.

Also on the upper level, in front of the vestibule leading to the house, three doors open onto the grand foyer, with three bay windows opening the view out on place Neuve. The grand foyer with, on the right hand side, the little foyer and, on the left hand side, the little salon, are the piano nobile of the main façade. The enfilade effect of the three spaces in the grand foyer is magnified by the subtle visual interplay of reflections from several oversized mirrors. The grandeur of the foyer recalls the Louvre's famous Galerie d’Apollon in Paris. The ceiling panels in the little foyer are by Léon Gaud. Several artists—painters and sculptors—were commissioned to decorate the inside and the outside of the building in an eclectic style.

The house was decorated in a style with gold highlights on light tones. Around the central cupola, from which hung a magnificent chandelier, a panelled ceiling with fifteen medallions featured portraits of nine actors and six singers. These medallions, along with the rest of the painted allegories (Music, Dramatic Performance and Dance) decorating the house, were the work of Pierre-Nicolas Brisset.

The first Grand Théâtre's technical infrastructure was also state-of-the-art, for the period. The stage curtain was powered by hydraulic pressure from the nearby Usine des Forces Motrices power plant on the river Rhône. Electric power was installed between 1905 and 1913, allowing the installation of a safety curtain, operated by an electric winch, and the replacement of gas lighting with electrical lights during performances.

== The Great Fire – Reconstruction 1951–1962 ==
On 1 May 1951 at 12:08 pm, while stagehands were preparing a set for the third act of Wagner's Die Walküre, a terrible fire broke out, destroying the stage, fly loft, grid and gangways and their mechanical and electric machinery. The safety curtain collapsed and the fire spread to the house, burning everything from the orchestra seats to the third tier, along with the painted panels and medallions in the ceiling and above the proscenium arch. The only parts of the theatre to escape the flames were the foyer and its external landing, the main entrance and vestibule, and the exterior façades, including those of the stage house.

The theatre remained closed for a decade, during which performances were transferred to the Grand Casino also called Kursaal. After the disaster, the City of Geneva commissioned several reconstruction projects. The reconstruction was finally conducted between 1958 and 1962 by two architects, Charles Schapfer from Geneva, and Marcello Zavelani-Rossi from Milan, with a Polish artist, Jacek Stryjenski, responsible for the decoration of the house. Following Stryjenski's death, local architects Albert Cingria and Georges Tamarasco completed the decoration. The slope of the ceiling continuing vertically into Stryjenski's ornamental safety curtain is built of silver- and gold-plated aluminium sheeting, with over a thousand lighting orifices fitted with Murano glass creating the impression of the Milky Way. The ceiling also includes three projections into which various lighting sources are installed, either to illuminate the ornamental metal surfaces or for the proscenium lights.

== The Grand Théâtre 1962 – to present ==
The Grand Théâtre reopened in December 1962, with the French version of Verdi's Don Carlos. Since this revival, several renowned directors have managed the Geneva opera house: in chronological order, Marcel Lamy (1962–1965), Herbert Graf (1965–1973), Jean-Claude Riber (1973–1980), Hugues Gall (1980–1995), Renée Auphan (1995–2001), Jean-Marie Blanchard (2001–2009), and Tobias Richter (2009–2019).

In its original 1879 version, the auditorium of the Grand Théâtre was shaped like a horseshoe (in the "Italian" style) with several tiers of balconies and boxes surrounding the auditorium on three sides. After the 1962 renovations, the auditorium's oval seating arrangement was altered to adopt a German-style "square" shape, where a full view of the stage is possible from any one of the auditorium's 1,488 seats (593 in the stalls, 199 in the first circle, 161 in the second circle and 535 in the amphitheatre/upper circle).

== Technical features and renovations ==
During the 1997–1998 season, two major refurbishment projects took place. First and most urgent (after 10 years of feasibility studies) the renovation of the stage machinery; second, various refurbishments in the public-access areas. Most of the work on the stage house, between the stage floor and the ceiling of the fly loft, where the overhead machinery (lights and set changes) operates, is not visible by the audience in the house. The renovation project involved 60 different companies and around 600 workers. Although no alterations were made to the building itself, its capacities have been thoroughly maximised. The German firm responsible for the renovation project, Mannesmann Rexroth, had previously worked on the Gothenburg Opera House and the stage machinery of the Salzburg Festival; the Grand Théâtre de Genève's stage renovation now features among this company's major achievements.

== Above the stage ==
After three decades of service, the stage machinery began to show signs of wear and tear. It underwent extensive refurbishments during the 1997–1998 renovations. Most of the transformations took place in parts of the theatre out of the audience's sight, namely the stage-house, between the ceiling and the floor, and the orchestra pit decks.

With four levels of gangways and thousands of cables cluttering it, the fly loft in particular was a real stumbling block. What was state-of-the-art in 1962 had become obsolete—almost a threat to security in the theatre—and the grid (the machinery above the stage) was thus completely transformed.

In order to guarantee maximum security and efficiency, the stage machinery was completely transformed and its operating system fully computerised. Refurbishments also included structural reinforcements to improve new load bearing capacities, the fitting of a hundred hydraulic winches, bearing 52 battens, each 20 metres (66 ft) long, attached to the sets and risen or lowered facing the audience. Their load capacity was increased from 500 to 1,000 kilograms (1,102 to 2,205 lb). The fly loft machinery operates on a high-pressure hydraulic motor system, allowing sets to be changed silently and with great speed (1.5 metres per second (4.9 ft/s)). Their movements are synchronised and their speed can be programmed according to stage effects.

With the new computerised system, fifteen motors can be run simultaneously from a single control panel, operating the battens, the light deck and proscenium curtain, which reveals or hides the stage during intermissions and can be used in different opening styles (Austrian, Venetian, pleated or tableau). The renovations also included reinforcement and enlargement of bridges and catwalks over the stage from 90 to 190 centimetres (35 to 75 in) width.

== In the house ==
The Hans Wilsdorf Foundation contributed 2.8 million for the refurbishment of the ground floor hall and the auditorium. In the hall, an original polychrome marble floor was brought to light after being hidden under red wall-to-wall carpeting. The house seats were fitted with wooden backs and onto a new wooden parquet floor. The safety curtain and the ceiling were stripped of asbestos and the stage floor completely redone. The orchestra pit was also renovated and can now be raised or lowered as deep as 6.5 metres (21 ft).

== The stage and below ==
The space below stage where the technical staff works is almost 13 metres (43 ft) deep; mobile stage decks lower sets and characters into this space out of the audience's sight. The central stage is made up of six decks, weighing 17 tonnes (17 long tons; 19 short tons) each, supported and powered by twelve hydraulic hoists, which can raise the decks, sets and performers above or below stage level and lower them to 8.67 metres (28.4 ft) below stage level.

The stage also features a self-supporting hydraulically powered back stage, which slides forward on two tracks, covering the space left in the central stage when the decks are lowered. On both sides of the stage, covering a wider area than the central stage, two floors are equipped with lightweight mobile wagons to carry sets onto centre stage.

The proscenium arch can be adjusted to different measurements. The orchestra pit can seat up to 100 musicians. The pit operates mechanically, with three movable decks allowing the orchestra to be seated on different levels and creating a proscenium apron when raised to stage level. Nowadays, the machinery below the stage still operates on a low-pressure hydraulic system, which has been regularly updated since it was installed in 1962.

The latest phase of alterations and modernisation of the machinery below the stage took place in 2006. Manoeuvring the gigantic mechanical elements with an unautomated electro-hydraulic system required important staff resources in order to guarantee minimum security. Automation of these components was thus a priority, as well as installing a new computer-operated hydroelectric system, which is synchronised with the fly loft machinery.

The Grand Théâtre technical staff took an active part in these refurbishments, along with external technical contractors called in on the project. House mechanics took apart and reassembled most of the essential works in the system, with their electrician colleagues refitting all the lighting equipment and rewiring it. The lighting control panel has now been replaced with computerised control desks that operate 500 electric circuits, twice as many as before the renovation work. The Grand Théâtre audio and video services completely renewed its equipment below the stage.

The cost of this project, altogether CHF 20 million, was financed by the City of Geneva and the Union of municipalities of the canton of Geneva. These renovations provide the Grand Théâtre with a state-of-the-art tool for the contemporary scenography and performance. Stage directors working at the Grand Théâtre can thus achieve high quality set changes and special effects on one of Europe's most efficient opera stages, which should remain operational until 2050.
