= A Session of the Painting Jury =

1885 painting by Henri Gervex

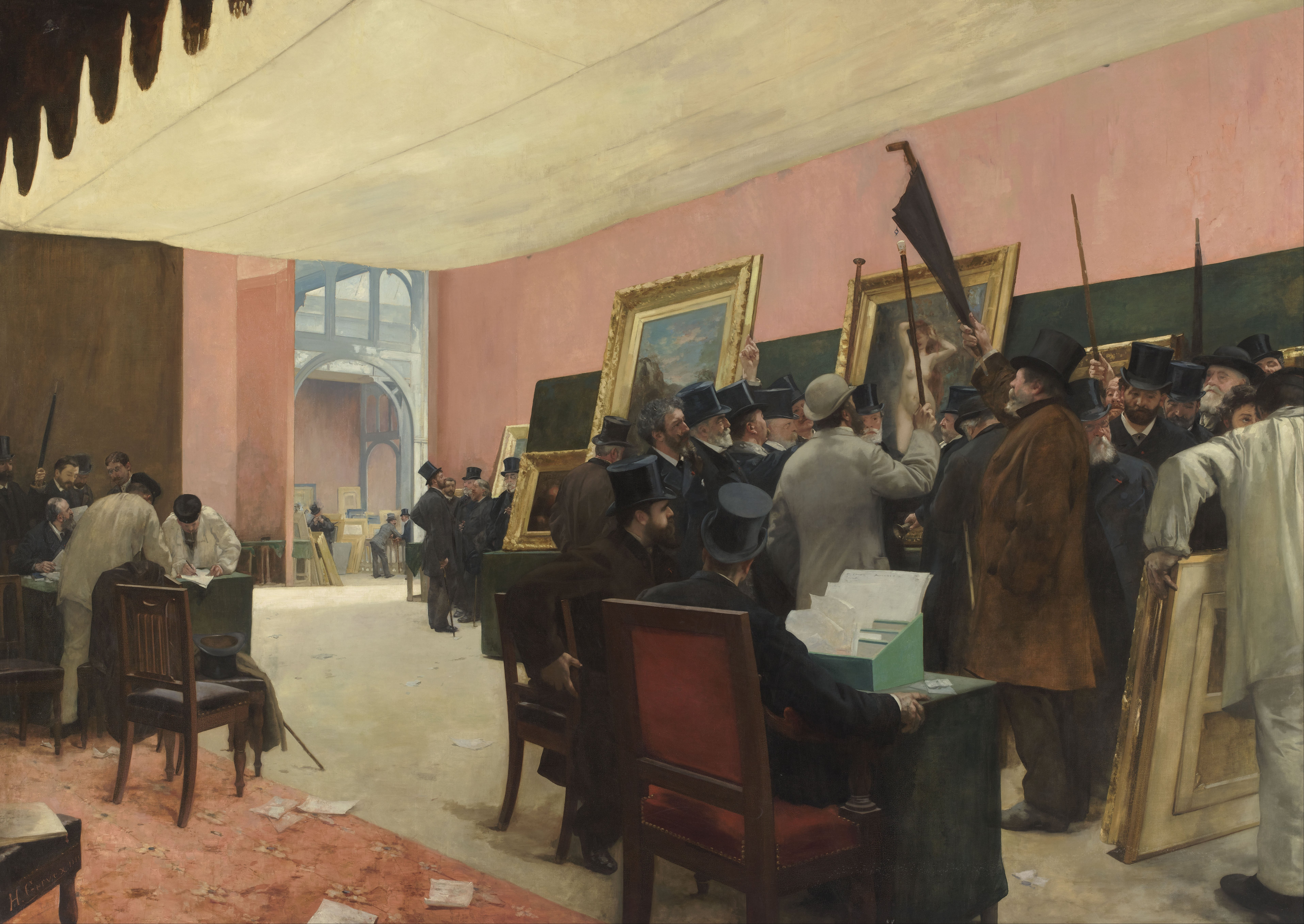
- Artist: Henri Gervex
- Year: c. 1883
- Medium: Oil on canvas
- Dimensions: 300 cm × 419 cm (120 in × 165 in)
- Location: Musée d'Orsay, Paris

A Session of the Painting Jury is an oil on canvas painting by the French artist Henri Gervex, probably from c. 1883. The painting, a piece of official art during the Third Republic, shows a meeting of the painting jury of the Salon, the official exhibition of the Académie des Beaux-Arts, in 1883.

== Description ==
The picture shows a room on the first floor of the Palais de l'Industrie. Shown in it are numerous identifiable artists of the time, who are involved in judging the works of art shown. Charles Louis Borgmeyer identified and specified the location of 28 artists:

The person in the first plane, seated and seen from the back is Hector Leroux. Maignan sits at his left, with his arm over the back of his chair. Vollon votes by raising his umbrella, the handle in the air. Carolus-Duran at the left, is looking at the picture and not voting. Rapin, with a light overcoat, votes with his cane raised; between him and Carolus-Duran one can see the heads of Busson, the lost profile of Jules Lefebvre and the nose and mustache of Guillemet. Back of Carolus-Duran, a little further away, stands Harpignies looking at a picture; at the right and nearer the front stands Cabanel looking at the picture of the nude twisting her hair, that the jury is voting on. Then nearer Vollon (the man with raised umbrella) are Bouguereau and Henner's shoulders; at the right of Vollon, grouped in front of a frame, are Barrias, Robert-Fleury and back of him again, to the left, is part of Jean-Paul Laurens; Bonnat and Français (wearing a round felt hat); back of him, Duez, with another umbrella, one eye and the wavy hair of Pille. At the left, where two attendants in blouses take notes, is a group made up of Vuillefroy, sitting, and Humbert, Cormon and Benjamin-Constant. In the background is Roll, talking with Gervex himself, and Puvis de Chavannes, Cazin and Protais.

The painting's page at the Musée d'Orsay website reiterates all the names given by Borgmeyer and also lists Edouard Detaille, Gustave Guillaumet, Evariste Vital Luminais, Alphonse de Neuville, and Eugène Lavieille.

In the latter half of the 19th century the Salon was an important and popular institution. The French state would acquire some of the paintings shown in the salon's exhibition, which would be hung in the Musée du Luxembourg.

== Provenance ==
The painting was exhibited in the Salon in 1885 and was subsequently acquired by Pierre Waldeck-Rousseau, who later became the Prime Minister of France. Waldeck-Rousseau gave the painting to the Musée du Luxembourg in 1892. It subsequently spent time in the Louvre and the Saint-Denis Museum, Reims, before being assigned to the Musée d'Orsay, Paris, in 1981, where it is still held.

== Sources ==
- Bayle, François (2011). A Fuller Understanding of the Paintings at the Orsay Museum. Paris: art lys. ISBN 978-2-85495-402-9.
- Borgmeyer, Charles Louis (1912). "The Study of Drawing—Tone Values and Harmony—The Knowledge of Technique" in Fine Arts Journal, November, 1912, Vol. 27, No. 5, pp. 679-709.
- Graham, B. D. (2006). Choice and Democratic Order: The French Socialist Party, 1937-1950. Cambridge: Cambridge University Press. ISBN 978-0-521-02566-9.
