= Léon Gaud =

Swiss painter

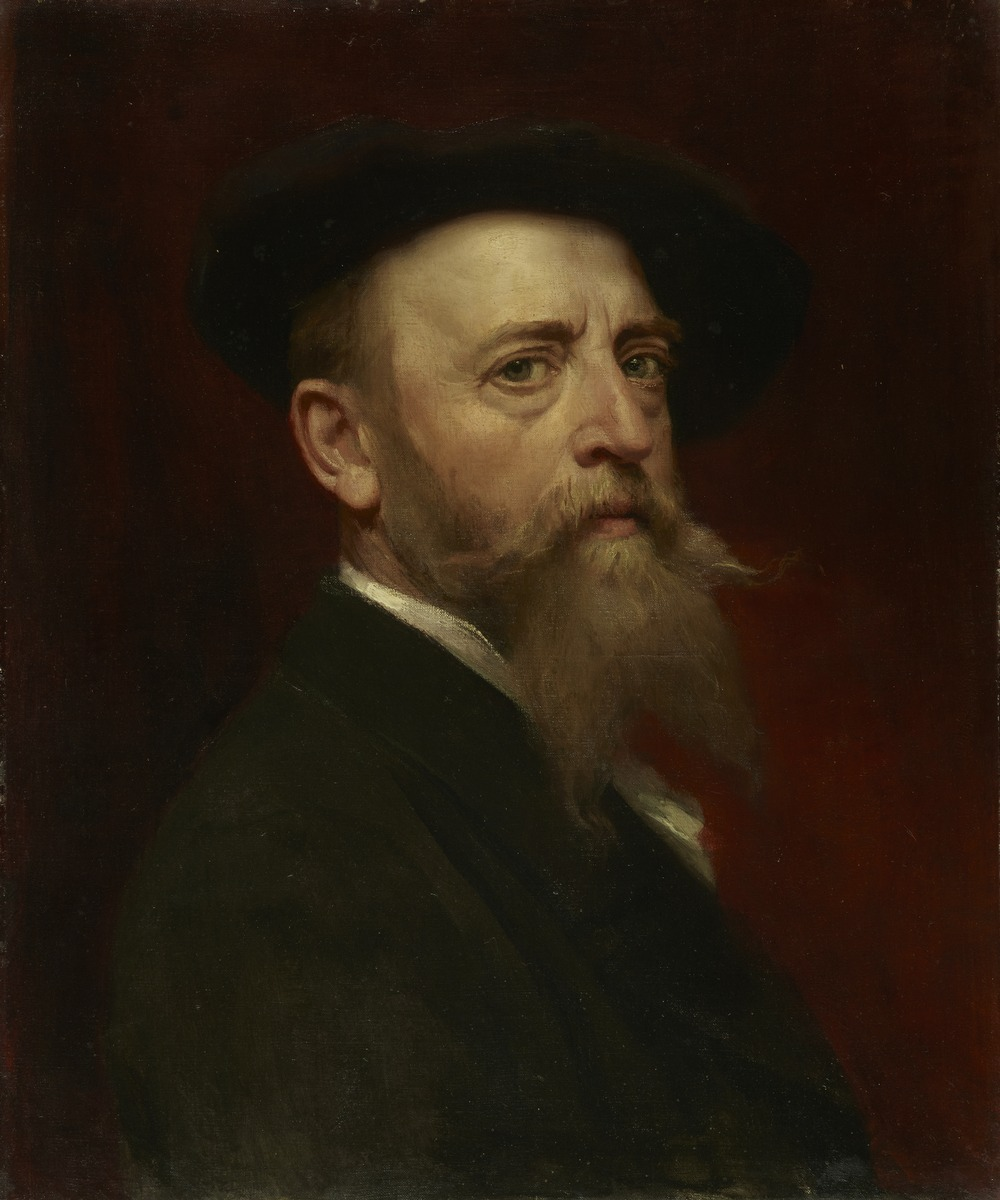
Self-portrait at the age of 52 (1896)

Léon Gaud (September 23, 1844 – November 18, 1908) was a Swiss painter from Chêne-Bourg, in the canton of Geneva.

== Biography ==
Born in Versoix, Gaud was a son of Antoine Marie Gaud, a teacher, and Marie Rous, née Lacroix. In 1873 he married Louise Pacot d'Yenne, daughter of Jean-Louis Pacot d'Yenne, French officer. He was a student in Geneva of the landscape painter Barthélemy Menn, under whose guidance he participated in the decoration of the Knight's Hall in Gruyères Castle, where he met Camille Corot. From 1862 he regularly participated in the Geneva Municipal Exhibitions.

In 1866, Gaud belonged to the Fourierist colony created by the Bovy family at Gruyères Castle. In 1902 he took over from Menn as director of the Geneva School of Arts and Crafts.

Gaud's favorite subjects were paysage intime (open-air painting) and pastoral or naturalistic landscape scenes closely associated with the area around Lake Geneva. Gaud also painted panels for the staircase of the Grand Théâtre de Genève and the town hall of Plainpalais. His portraits and landscapes are permanently exhibited in the Geneva Musée d'Art et d'Histoire.

In 1900 he was awarded a silver medal at the Paris Exposition universelle. He died in 1908 in Les Eaux-Vives.

Swiss president Guy Parmelin chose one of Gaud’s painting to hang in his office in 2016. Like any member of the Federal Council he could chose from a vast collection of paintings that belong to the Swiss State to be hanged in his office during his administrativ years in the Palace Federal.
