= Jacek Stryjenski =

Polish artist (1922–1961)

- Born: 21 November 1922; Kraków, Poland
- Died: 8 March 1961 (aged 38); Geneva, Switzerland
- Education: Academy of Fine Arts in Warsaw
- Known for: Painting, murals and mosaics, stage and costume design, stained glass
- Notable work: Ceiling of the Grand Théâtre de Genève

Jacek Stryjenski (21 November 1922 – 8 March 1961) was a Polish artist. His work included painting, theatre design and religious art. He created mosaics for Saint-François de Sales in Chêne-Bourg and designed the ceiling of the Grand Théâtre de Genève, which was completed after his death in 1962.

== Biography ==
Jacek Stryjeński was born on 21 November 1922 in Kraków, Poland, the son of Karol Stryjeński, an architect, and Zofia Stryjeńska (née Lubańska), a painter. He was the twin brother of architect Jan Stryjeński and a great-grandson of military officer and cartographer Aleksander Stryjeński. Between 1937 and 1939, Stryjeński studied graphic design at the Academy of Fine Arts in Warsaw, before the Second World War brought his studies to an end.

In June 1940, Stryjeński entered Switzerland with the Polish Prugar-Ketling Division and was interned there. He finished his education in Wetzikon and then at ETH Zurich. In 1943, he designed wall decoration for the Polish Museum in Rapperswil. After settling in Geneva in 1946, Stryjeński worked in theatre design, producing sets and costumes, including for Marcelle Moynier's puppet theatre. His work was included in a modern art exhibition at the Kunstmuseum Luzern in 1959.

Stryjeński died in Geneva on 8 March 1961. His funeral was held at Saint-François de Sales, the church for which he had created mosaics. His funeral eulogy also referred to the significance of the church's mosaic programme.

== Work ==
Stryjeński’s work ranged from painting and mural decoration to stage design and costumes.

=== Church commissions ===
In 1949, Stryjeński designed two mosaics depicting Saint Francis de Sales and Saint Paul for the western façade of Saint-François de Sales in Chêne-Bourg. He collaborated with Geneva mosaic artist René Antonietti on these works. Around the same time, Stryjeński also worked on a church mural in Challes-les-Eaux, France. He planned further decoration for the Saint-François de Sales façade, including a mourning scene and figures of angels, but the design remained unexecuted.

Between 1950 and 1955, Stryjeński created a larger mosaic programme for the apse of Saint-François de Sales. Christ occupies the centre of the composition, accompanied by Mary, John the Evangelist and Peter. Saint Francis de Sales appears to one side, paying homage to Christ. The mosaics on the arch framing the apse depict two archangels, one holding a model of the church.

The apse mosaics draw on Byzantine artistic traditions. The ornamental motifs on the chancel vault have been compared with mosaics in the Basilica of San Vitale in Ravenna. The archangels' geometric forms are reminiscent of the earlier work of his mother, Zofia Stryjeńska. The Geneva mosaics have been described as among the most interesting examples of post-war church mosaics in Switzerland.

Stryjeński also designed stained glass for Sainte-Thérèse in Geneva. His widow completed the Sainte-Thérèse windows after his death.

=== Grand Théâtre de Genève ===
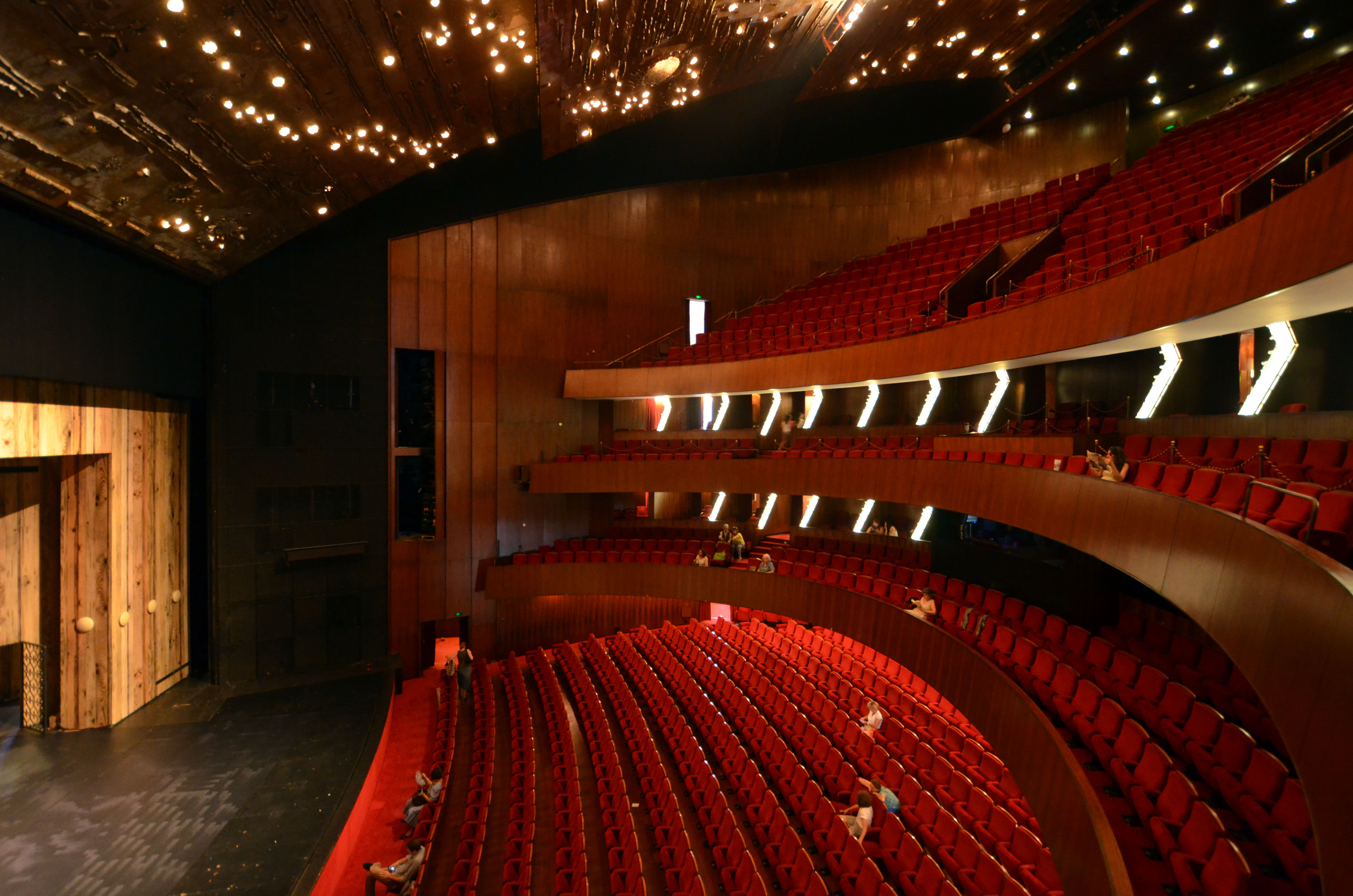
Auditorium of the Grand Théâtre de Genève

Following a fire in 1951, the Grand Théâtre de Genève, an opera house, underwent reconstruction. In 1960, Stryjeński won an international competition to decorate its auditorium. His ceiling design, titled Alto, incorporated 1,200 illuminated glass stars. The stars represented the Milky Way. The ceiling comprised 252 aluminium panels decorated with gold, copper and silver leaf. A metal stage curtain extended the celestial motif towards the stage. The ceiling concealed the auditorium's lighting.

The ceiling was completed in 1962, after Stryjeński's death. The renovated opera house reopened that year with a seating capacity of nearly 1,500.
