= Henri Gervex =

French painter (1852–1929)

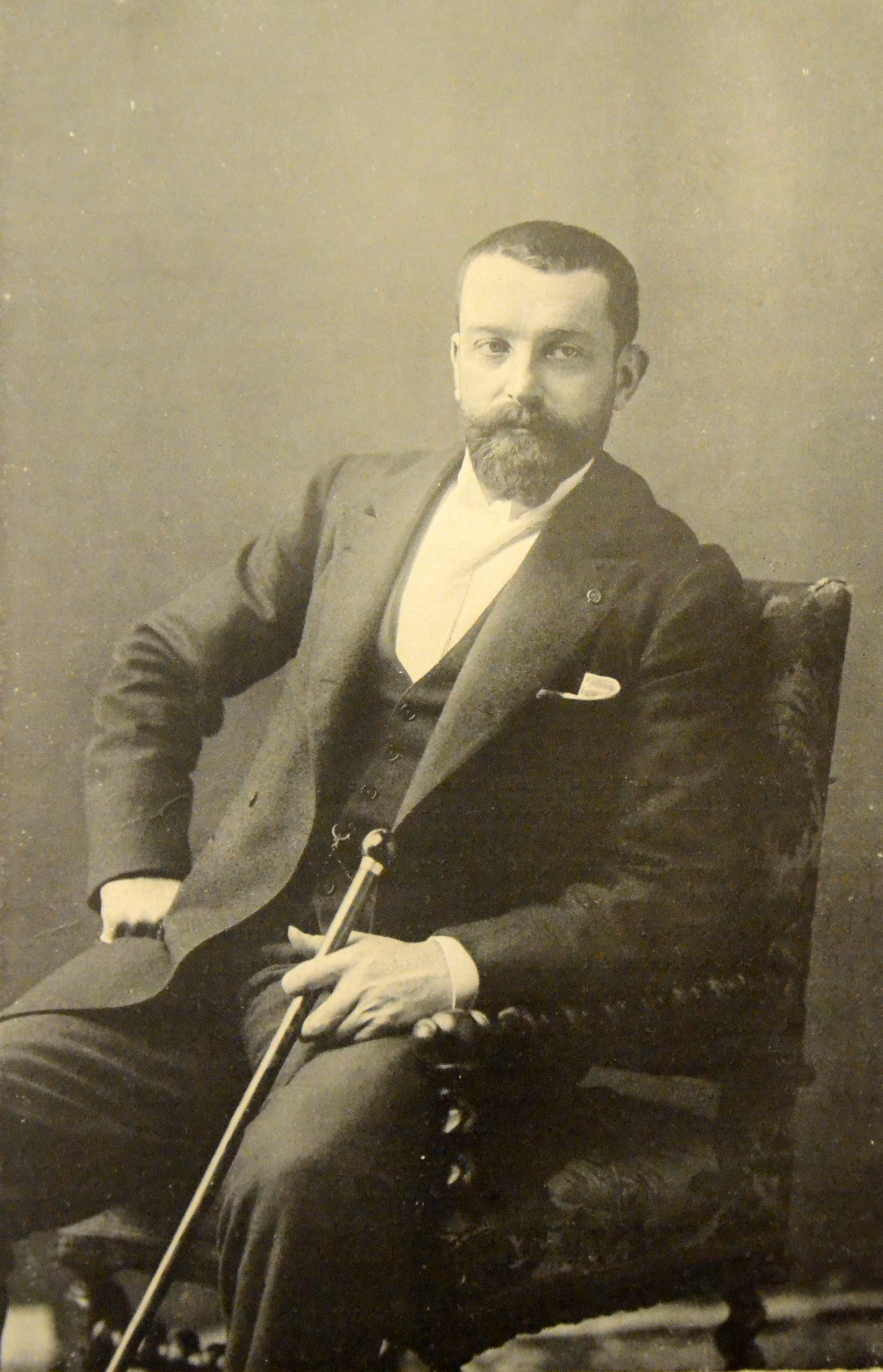
- Born: 10 December 1852; Paris, France
- Died: 7 June 1929 (aged 76); Paris
- Education: Alexandre Cabanel, Pierre-Nicolas Brisset, Eugène Fromentin
- Known for: Painting
- Notable work: Rolla, Dr Péan at the Salpétrière ("The Operation")
- Awards: Legion of Honour

Henri Gervex (10 December 1852 – 7 June 1929) was a French painter who studied painting under Alexandre Cabanel, Pierre-Nicolas Brisset, and Eugène Fromentin.

== Biography ==
=== Early years ===
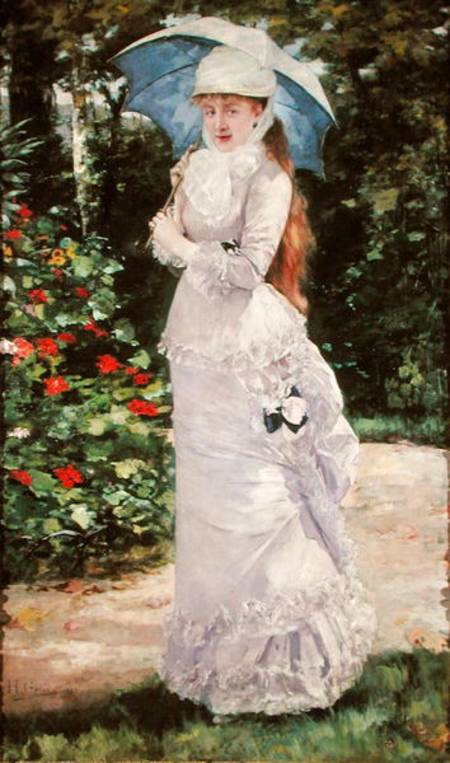
One painting of "Valtesse de La Bigne", 1879

He was the son of Joséphine Peltier and Félix Nicolas Gervex, a piano maker. When he was 15, a friend of the family helped him get admitted to the atelier of Pierre-Nicolas Brisset. Three years later, he served in the 152nd Battalion of the National Guard. In 1871 he was accepted into the École des Beaux-Arts in the studio of Alexandre Cabanel, where he studied for five years along with Jean-Louis Forain, Fernand Cormon, and Eugène Damas, a landscape painter. He also apprenticed himself to the Orientalist painter Eugène Fromentin.

=== Debut ===
His early work belonged almost exclusively to the mythological genre, which served as an excuse for the painting of the nude, but not always in the best of taste. His Rolla of 1878, based on a poem by Alfred de Musset, was rejected by the jury of the Salon de Paris for immorality, since it depicted a scene from the poem of a naked prostitute after having sex with her client. However, the censorship only made Gervex's painting even more famous, and launched the career of Gervex, then age 26. Although banned from the Salon, Rolla was exhibited in a nearby private gallery and became, according to the book Famous Pictures Reproduced from Renowned Paintings By the World's Greatest Artists, "probably the most successful private exhibition made in Paris." The book also called Rolla "a masterpiece, one of the few real great works on modern art."

Gervex was one of many lovers entertained by the famous courtesan Valtesse de La Bigne. Their relationship was long and deep, with Gervex including the golden haired beauty in his piece of art called The Civil Marriage of 1881; here Valtesse De la Bigne is dressed from head to toe in blue, her favourite colour, standing beside a dark haired man with a moustache. Another painting of La Bigne inspired Émile Zola in the creation of his heroine for the novel Nana, and Gervex himself was the model for the character of an opportunistic painter who appears in Zola's novel L'Œuvre (The Work [of Art], 1886).

Gervex afterwards devoted himself to representations of modern life and achieved signal success with his Dr Péan at the Salpétrière ("The Operation"), a modernized paraphrase, as it were, of Rembrandt's Anatomy Lesson.

== Career ==
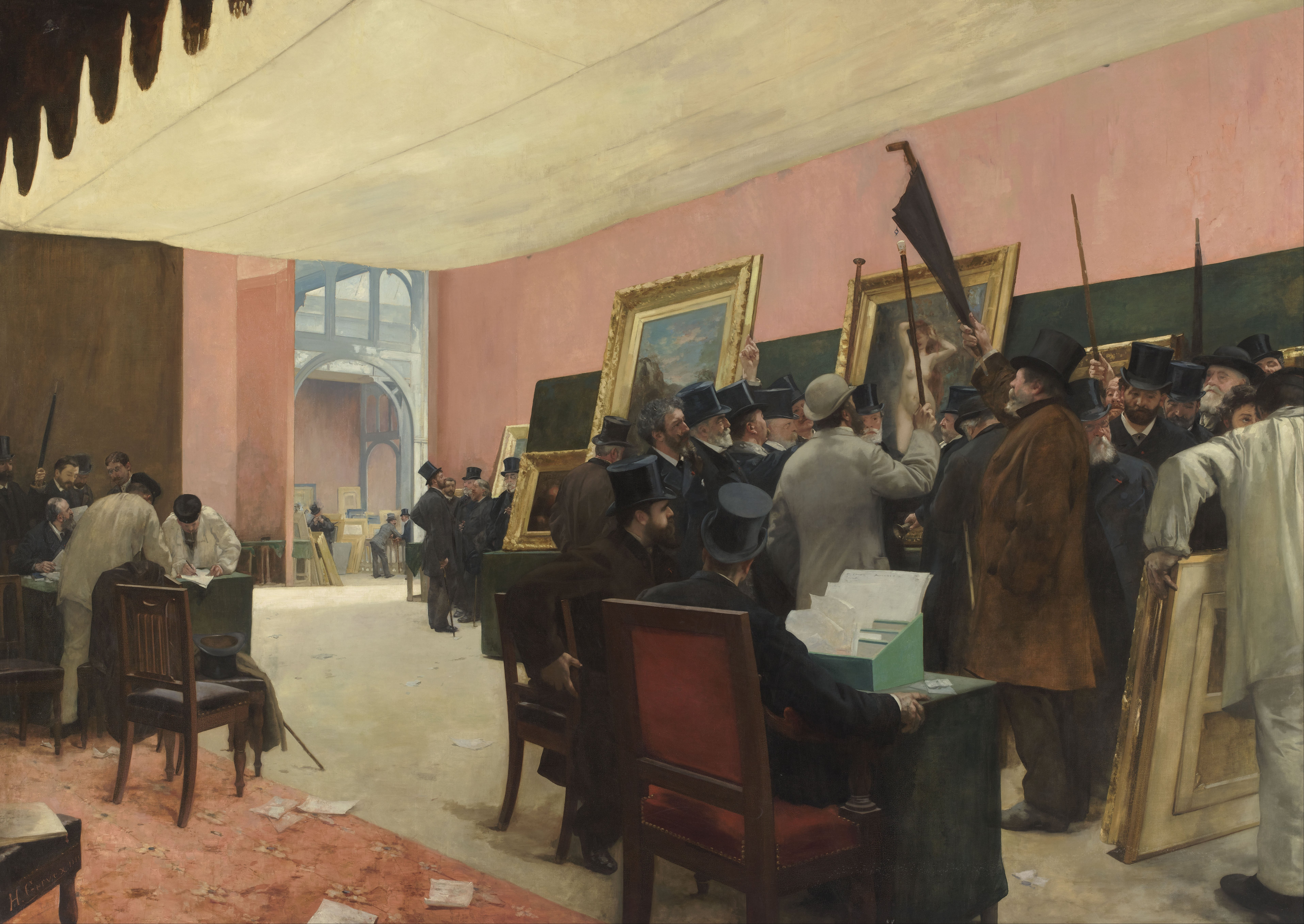
A Session of the Painting Jury, c. 1883, Musée d'Orsay.

He was entrusted with several important official paintings and the decoration of public buildings. Among the first are The Distribution of Awards (1889) at the Palais de l'Industrie, The Coronation of Nicolas II, The Mayors' Banquet (1900), and the portrait group La République Française; and among the second, the ceiling for the Salle des Fêtes (ballroom) at the Hôtel de Ville, Paris, and the decorative panels painted in conjunction with Emile-Henri Blanchon for the mairie of the 19th arrondissement, Paris. For this work, Gervex received the Legion of Honour. He also painted, with Alfred Stevens, a panorama, The History of the Century (1889). The Musée du Luxembourg holds his painting Satyr Sporting with a Bacchante. Other pictures of importance, besides numerous portraits in oils and pastel, are The Birth of Venus, Communion at Trinity Church, Return from the Ball, Diana and Endymion, Job, Civil Marriage, At the Ambassadeurs, Yachting in the Archipelago, Diane and Acteon, Nana, and Maternity.

While traveling in Russia in 1893, he was commissioned by Czar Nicholas II to paint his coronation and individual portraits of the royal family.

In 1913, he was elected to the Académie des Beaux-Arts.

His house and studio at 68 rue de Chavreau in Paris, which he built in the 1890s to give him the space to create large-scale works including his commissions for Nicholas II, was later purchased by dancer Isadora Duncan.

== Works ==
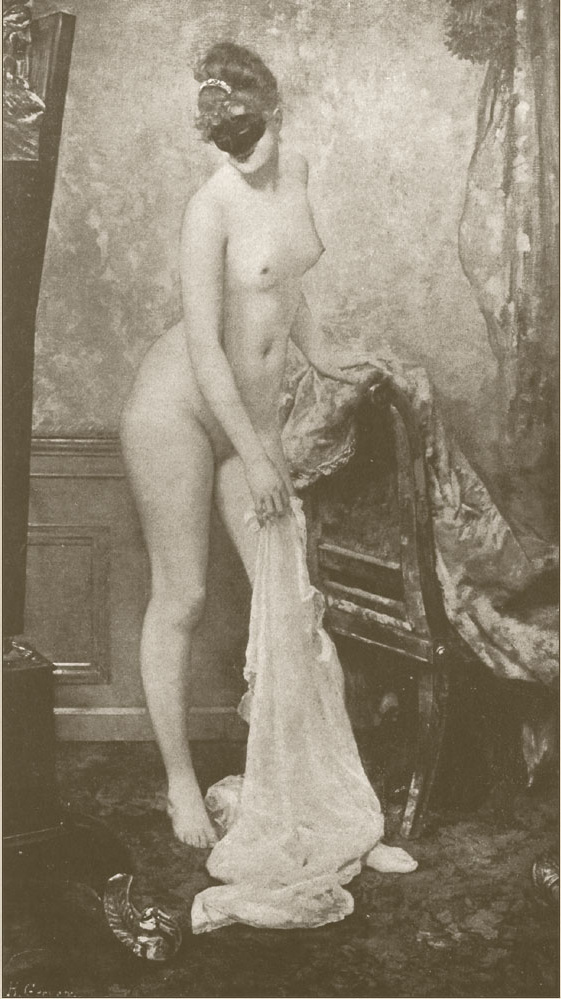
La femme au Masque, 1885, which garnered world-wide attention in a 1902 court case because Camille du Gast had been falsely accused of being the subject.

Henri Gervex's works

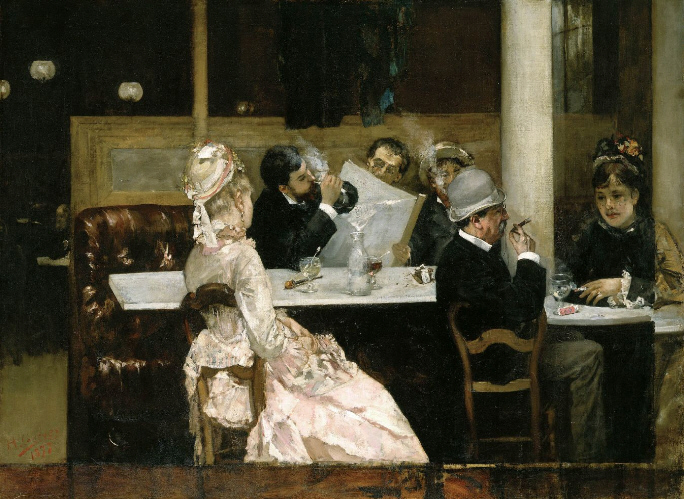
Café Scene in Paris, 1877

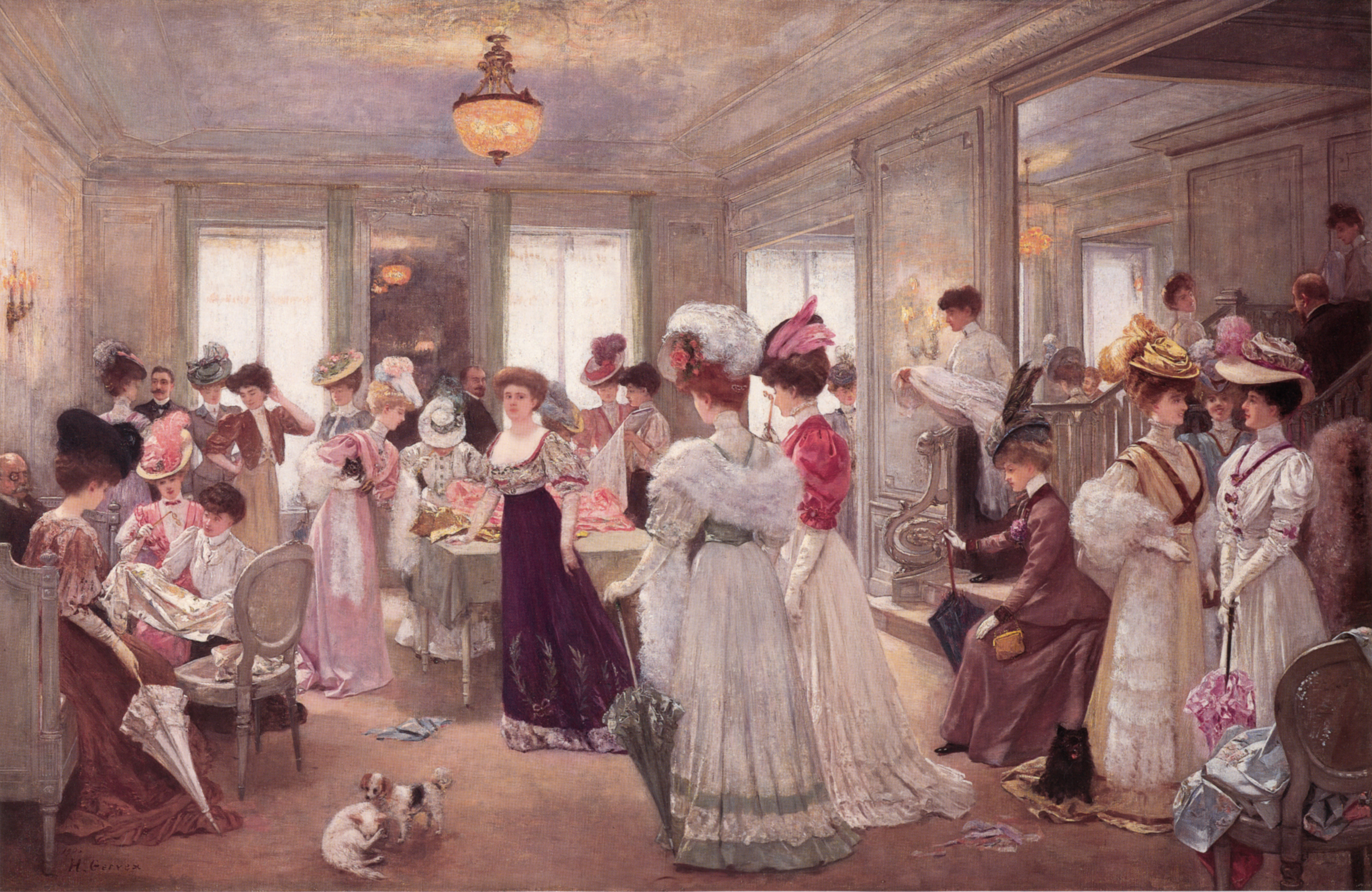
Cinq Heures Chez Paquin

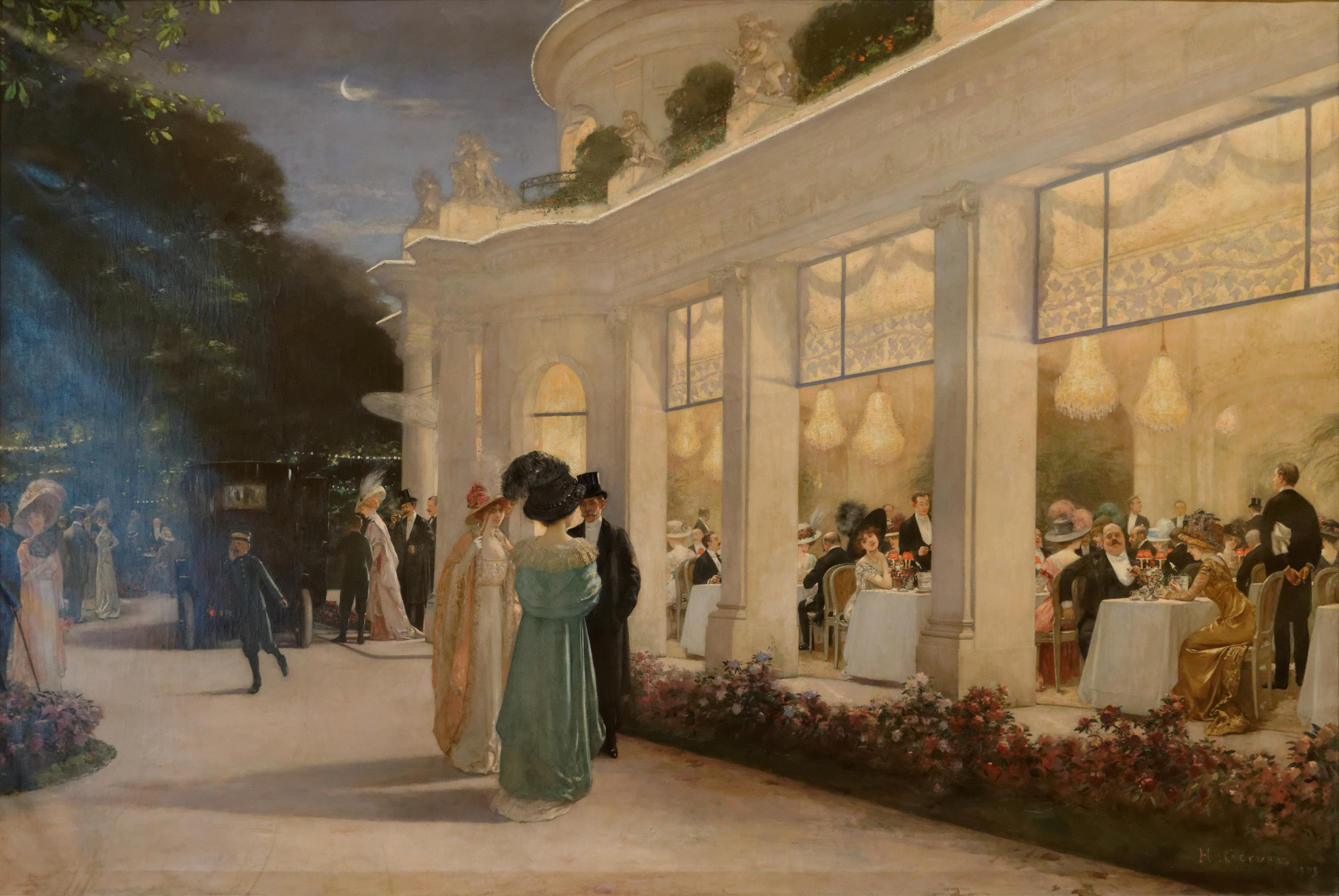
A soirée

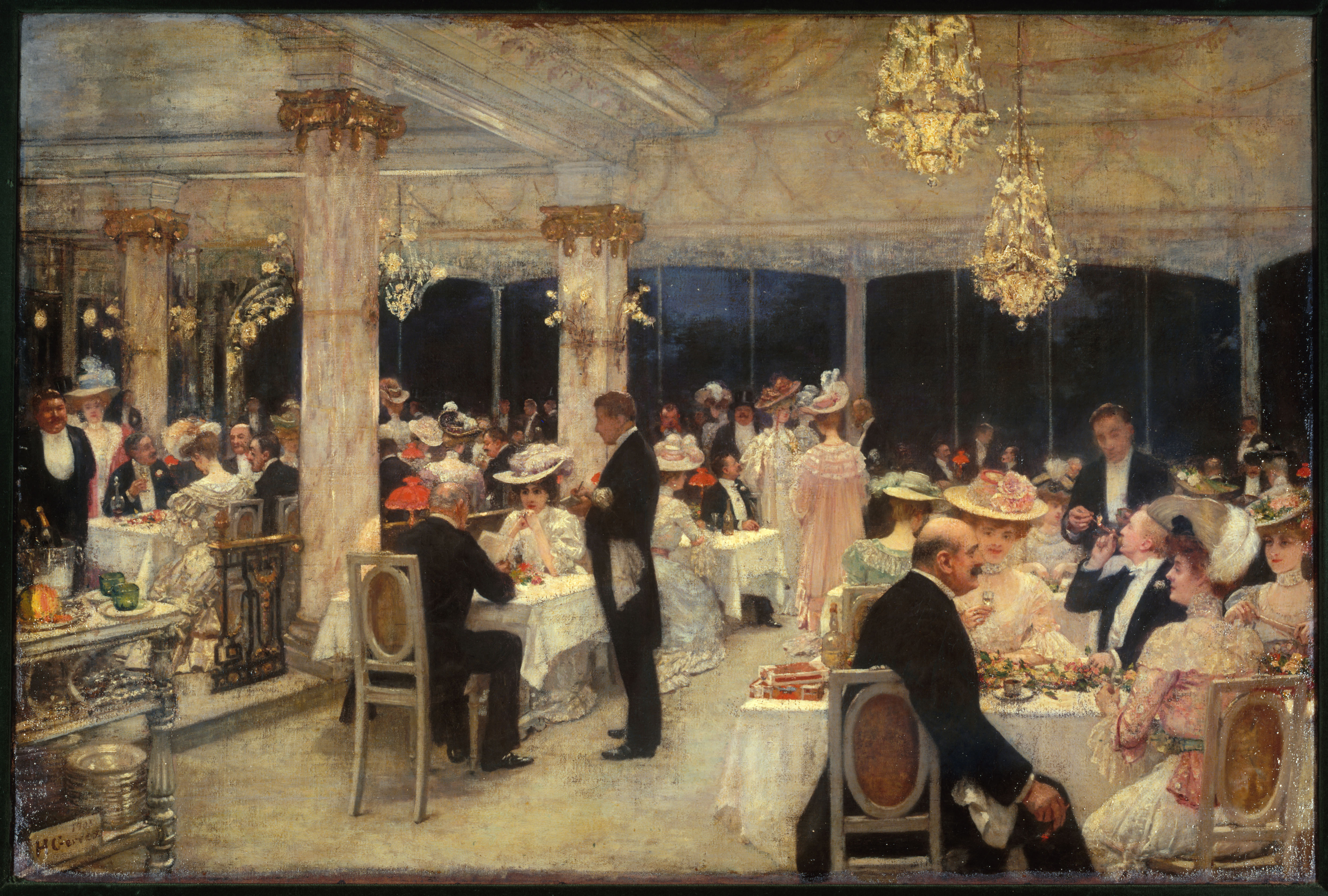
Un soir de grand prix au pavillon d'Armenonville

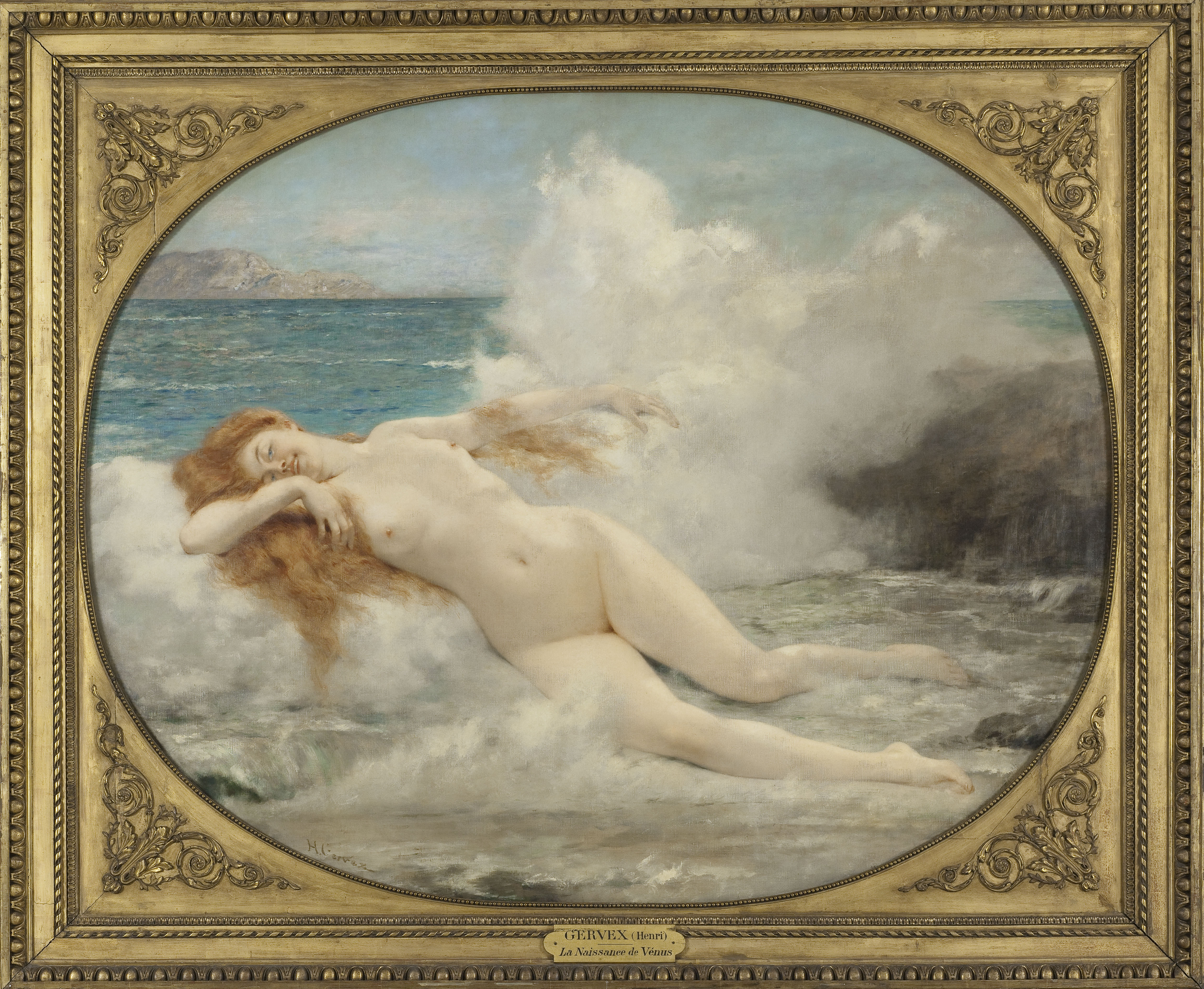
The Birth of Venus (1907)

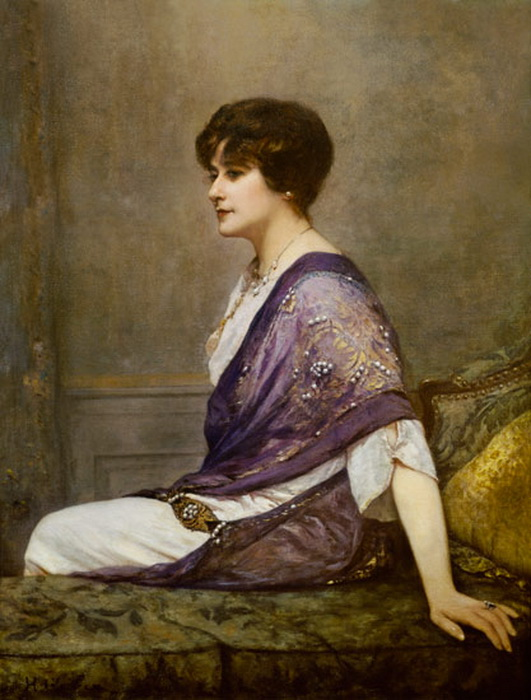
Portrait of the Couturier Madame Paquin

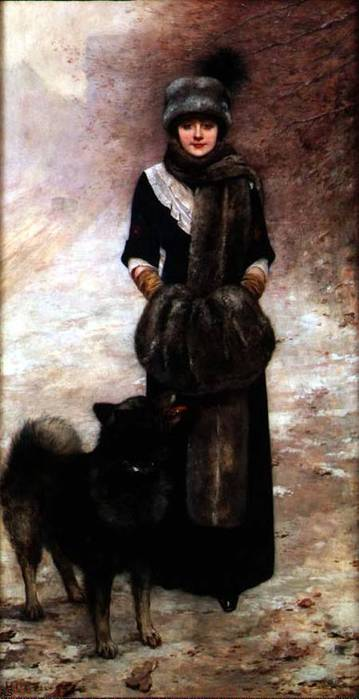
Portrait of Colette Gervex, daughter of Henri Gervex

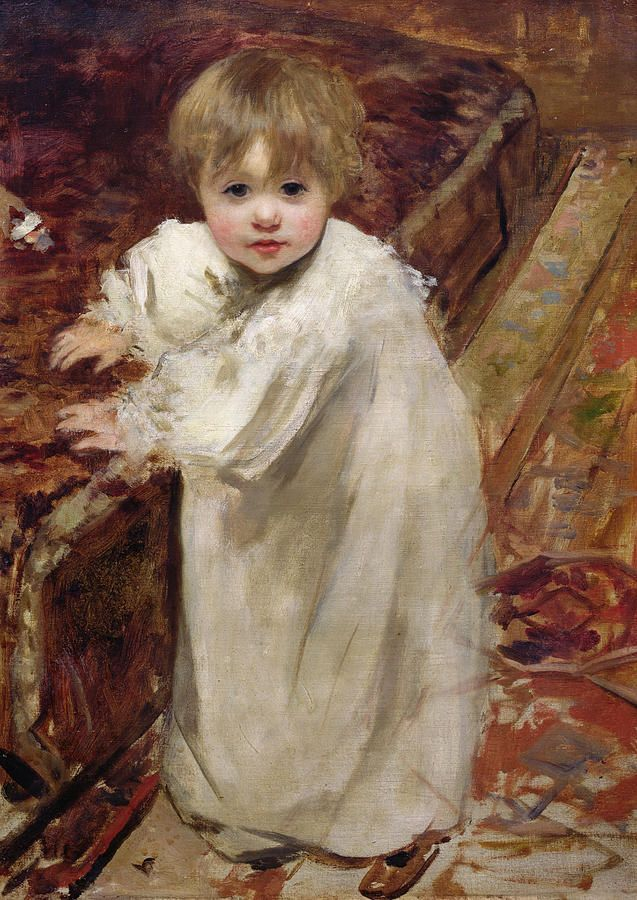
Colette's First Steps

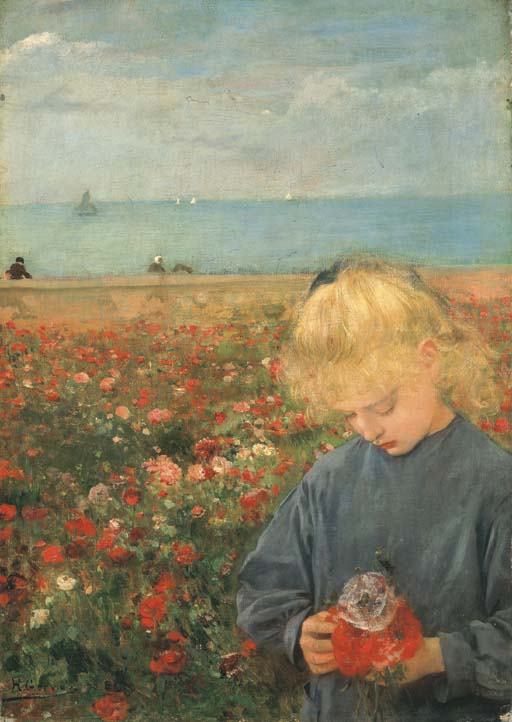
Fillette dans un champ de coquelicots

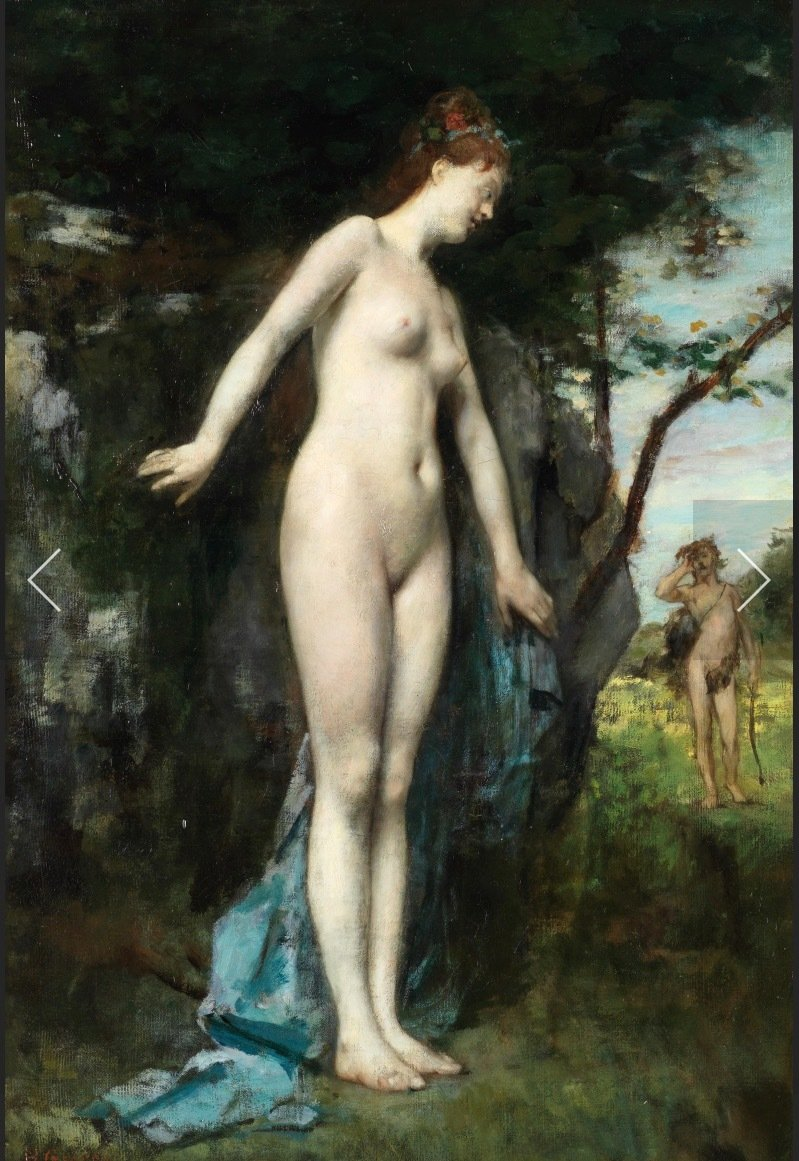
Diane et Acteon (olio su tela - 1890 c.ca)

== Students ==
- Jacques-Émile Blanche (1861-1942)
- Georges Dubosc (1854-1927)
- Henry Gerbault (1863-1930)

== See also ==
- Before the Operation
