= Jules-Émile Péan =

French surgeon

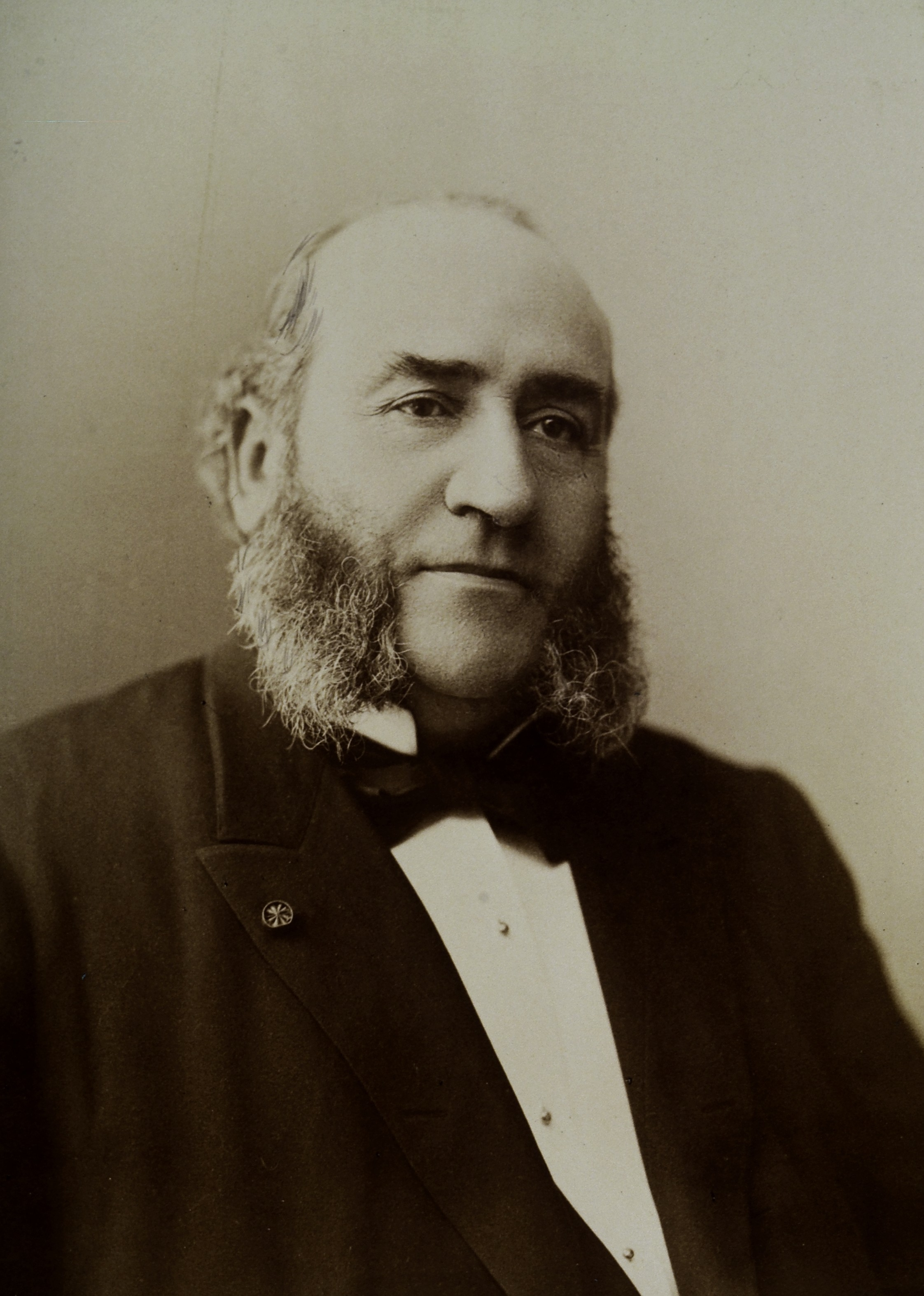
- Jules-Émile Péan. Photograph by Charles Reutlinger.
- Born: 29 November 1830; Marboué
- Died: 30 January 1898 (aged 67); 8th arrondissement of Paris
- Occupation: Surgeon, medical doctor
- Employer: Hôpital Saint-Louis (1872–)
- Awards: Commander of the Legion of Honour (1892); Montyon Science Award (hysterotomy, 1874)

Jules-Émile Péan (French pronunciation: [ʒyl emil peɑ̃]; 29 November 1830 – 20 January 1898) was one of the great French surgeons of the 19th century.

Péan was born in 1830 in Marboué, french department of Eure-et-Loir. He studied at the college of Chartres and then studied medicine in Paris under Auguste Nélaton. He was appointed a doctor in 1861 and worked at St. Antoine and St. Louis up to 1893. He then created with its expenses the international hospital. He wrote two volumes of private clinics (1876 and 1890). He was elected to the French Académie Nationale de Médecine on November 22, 1887, and was awarded the rank of Commander of Legion of Honor in 1893. He died on January 20, 1898, in Paris. A street, Rue Péan, was named after him in Châteaudun, Cloyes-sur-le-Loir and Paris.

Péan was very admired and a follower of hygiene, he disputed the discoveries of Louis Pasteur. He refused to dissect corpses and operated preferably in residence. Although a teacher, he was never named professor. He was the first to make a successful surgical ablation of one cyst of the ovary in 1864. He was also a pioneer in performing a vaginal hysterectomy for carcinoma in 1890. He is believed to have performed the first surgery to correct diverticula of the bladder in 1895. In 1893, he attempted the first known total joint arthroplasty, operating on the shoulder of a French waiter; it had to be removed two years later due to infection. He popularized the hemostat that is still used in operating rooms around the world.

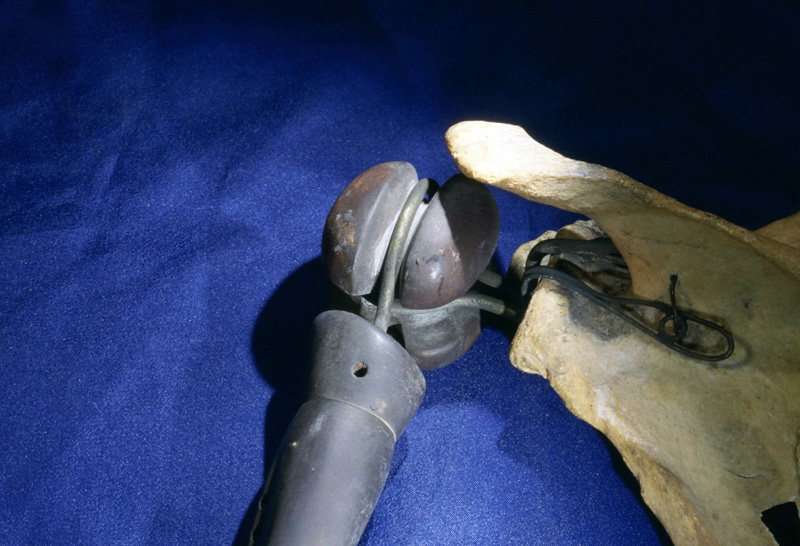
Mock up of artificial shoulder implanted by French surgeon Jules-Émile Péan in 1893. The implant remained in the shoulder of the patient, a waiter, for two years, when it had to be removed due to infection

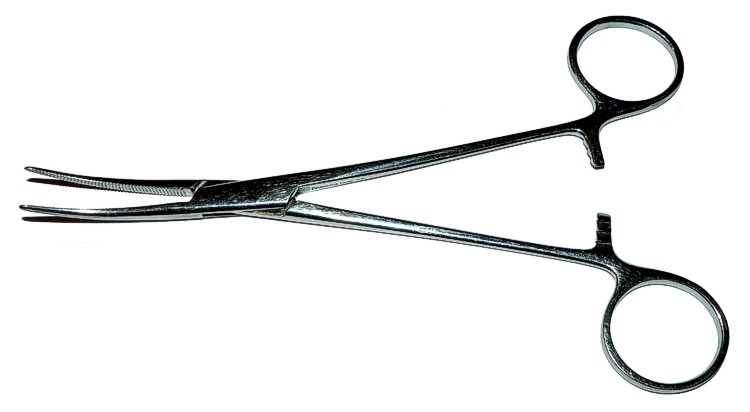
Pean hemostat

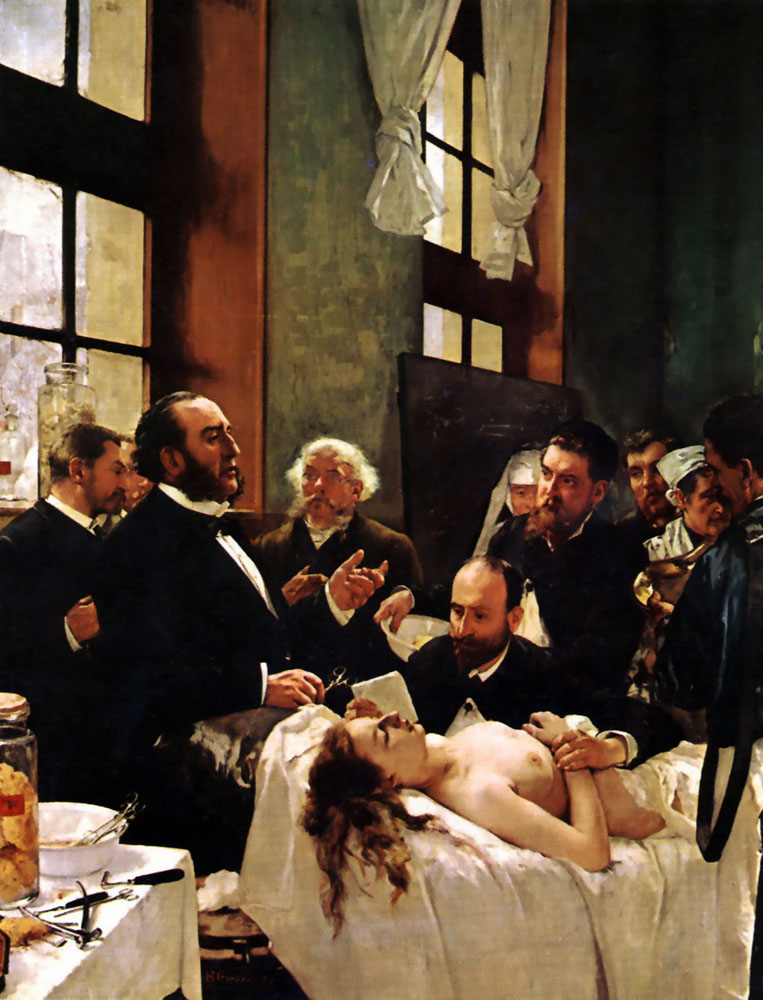
Before the Operation
