= Before the Operation =

Painting by Henri Gervex

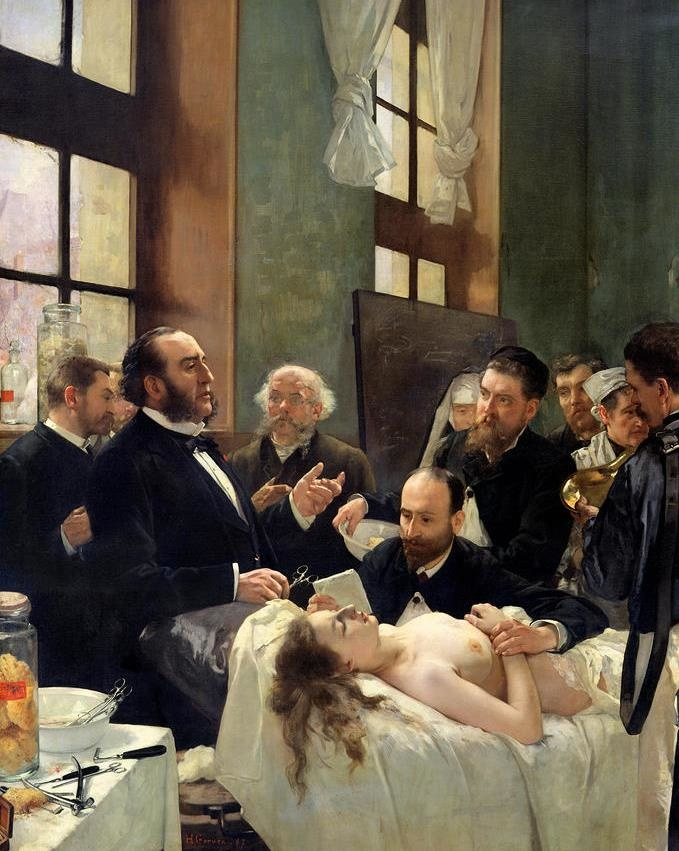
- Artist: Henri Gervex
- Year: 1887
- Medium: oil painting
- Dimensions: 242 cm × 188 cm (95 in × 74 in)
- Location: Musée d'Orsay, Paris
- Accession: DO 1986 20

Before the Operation (also known as Dr Péan Teaching His Discovery of the Compression of Blood Vessels at St Louis Hospital, (French: Avant l'opération, Le Docteur Péan enseignant à l'hôpital Saint-Louis sa découverte du pincement des vaisseaux) is an 1887 painting by Henri Gervex. It was exhibited at the Salon of 1887.

== Provenance ==
Until 1918 the painting was in the collection of Mrs. Jules Emile Péan, widow of the subject of the painting. In 1918 it was accepted as a gift from her by the state, and it was housed in the Musée du Luxembourg until 1931. It was then transferred to the Louvre and assigned to the Palace of Versailles where it remained until 1936. Then it was moved to the Musée de l'Assistance Publique – Hôpitaux de Paris where it spent the next fifty years before being added to the Musëe d’Orsay collection in 1986.

== Exhibition history ==
- 1887 - Salon de la Société des artistes français, Paris
- 1918 - Pintura Francesa Contemporanea 1870-1914, Madrid
- 1951 - La chirurgie dans l'Art, Musée de la Mode de la Ville de Paris
- 1973 - Equivoques: peintures françaises du XIXe siècle - musée des Arts décoratifs, Paris
- 1974 - Paris d'Hier et d'aujourd'hui - Galeries nationales du Grand Palais - Paris
- 1981 - untitled exhibition, Musée de l'Assistance publique – Hôpitaux de Paris
- 1992 - Henri Gervex (1852–1929) - Musée des Beaux-Arts de Bordeaux
- 1993 - Henri Gervex (1852–1929) - Musée Carnavalet, Paris
- 1993 - Henri Gervex (1852–1929) - Musée des Beaux-Arts de Nice
- 1998 - Autopsie d'une consultation - musée municipal, Hazebrouck

== Themes ==
The painting depicts the famous doctor Jules-Émile Péan surrounded by colleagues and pupils, with the body of a female patient in the foreground. The work has been compared with Rembrandt’s famous painting The Anatomy Lesson of Dr. Nicolaes Tulp, although the composition of the two works is quite different: Gervex emphasises the attitudes and movements of his figures, who are held together by a dense web of gestures and glances.

Large-scale salon paintings like Avant l’Operation were a means of constructing a heroic image for doctors in the nineteenth century. The juxtaposition of the authoritative famous male doctor, formally dressed, and the supine woman, naked, anaesthetised and anonymous, establishes a powerful contrast at the centre of the work. It positions the doctor as “virile, rational, republican and modern”. Significantly, Péan is not depicted in the act of surgery. Instead the painting captures the moment before the operation, a ‘moment of cleanliness, hygiene, and control, the moment before the surgeon’s clean hands and white shirt would be stained with the woman’s blood’.

In terms of style, certain elements of the painting bear a resemblance to the work of the Impressionists, such as the cut off view and the buildup of paint in key areas such as on the figure of Dr Zacharian, the wall behind him and the window. Other elements, such as the realistic and detailed depot the medical instruments in the foreground suggest a more traditional style.

== Critical reception ==
Gervex's work was described by reviewers of the 1887 salon, including Georges Lafenestre, fr: Roger Ballu and Louis de Fourcaud as being of the utmost realism and sincerity. At the same time, in tension with this supposed ‘photographic’ realism, critics also acknowledged the sexual character of the painting (Gerbex had had a previous work, Rolla refused for the Salon of 1878 on the grounds of obscenity). The positioning of the woman's body is anything but clinical - she is positioned according to the academic conventions of female nudes; she is ‘salaciously rendered’ and her hair tumbles down freely. The sexual dimension is enhanced by the contrast between the pallid flesh of the woman and the dark clothes of the doctors; also in the contact between pale her body and the livelier skin hue of young doctor Zacharian whose arm rests on her body as he holds her wrist in his hand.

Not all critics responded favourably to the work, or for the growing public taste for medical subjects in salon paintings. Under the heading “Artistic Horrors” the Medical Press and Circular commented “if this morbid taste continues to develop, we shall, in a few years, be favoured with pictures of operations before which even the blasé Parisians will stand aghast.”
