= Pierre-Nicolas Brisset =

French painter (1810–1890)

The Ponte Nomentano (1837) Los Angeles County Museum of Art

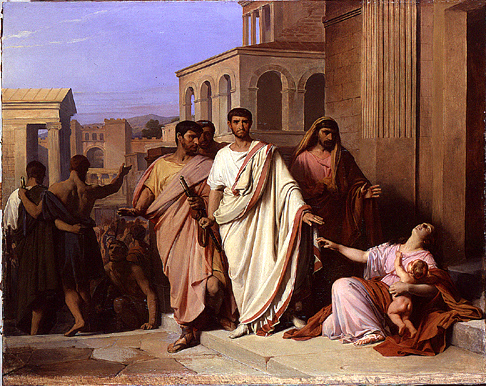
Gaius Gracchus Summoned by the Senate (1840)

Pierre-Nicolas Brisset (18 August 1810 – 29 March 1890) was a French painter and muralist in the Academic style. He is best known for his mythological, historical and religious scenes, but also painted landscapes and portraits.

== Biography ==
He was born in Paris. His father was a manufacturer of printing presses. At the age of eighteen, he was apprenticed in the workshop of Louis-Charles-Auguste Couder and later studied with François-Édouard Picot. During this time, he also studied at the École nationale supérieure des beaux-arts. A trip to Italy in 1835 inspired Brisset to paint a series of works on historical subjects, monuments and ruins, notably the Ponte Nomentano on the Aniene River.

In 1840, he was awarded the Prix de Rome in painting for his depiction of Gaius Gracchus summoned before the Senate. From 1841 to 1845, he lived at the Villa Medici in Rome. While there, he painted Saint Lawrence Showing the Treasures of the Church, which enjoyed great success when it was displayed at the Salon and the Palais des Beaux-Arts de Lille.

From 1846 to 1853, Brisset assisted Picot in painting frescoes at the Church of Saint-Vincent-de-Paul, one of the largest construction projects during the reign of King Louis Philippe. Over the years, he created several murals of his own at the Church of La Sainte-Trinité and in the Chapel of the Virgin at the Basilica of Sainte-Clotilde, as well as at the churches of Saint-Augustin and Saint-Roch.

In 1862, he helped design a 100 Francs banknote for the Banque de France. It used new technologies, designed to prevent counterfeiting, and was in use until 1923. Six years later, he was named a Knight in the Légion d'honneur.

In 1879, Brisset participated in decorating the Grand Théâtre de Genève, but most of his work there was destroyed by fire in 1951. Some of his designs may still be seen at the Hôtel de la Païva and the Hôtel Matignon. In 1883, he took part in preparations to restore the frescoes at Fontainbleau. He was also a private art teacher. His best known student was Henri Gervex.

He died in Paris on 29 March 1890.
