= Hemostat =

Surgical clamp tool commonly used to control bleeding

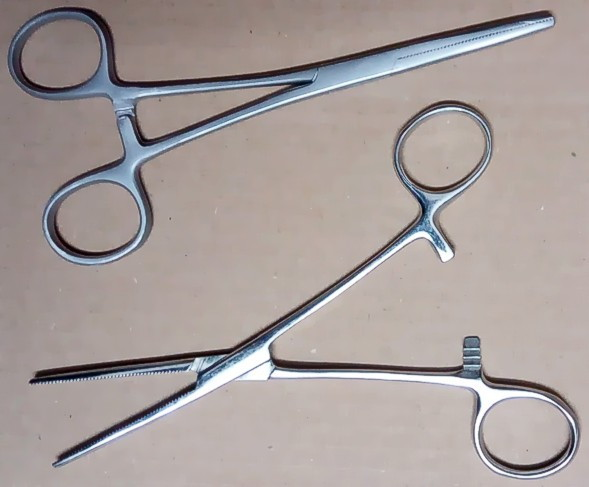
Hemostats

A hemostat (also called a hemostatic clamp; arterial forceps; and pean, after Jules-Émile Péan) is a tool used to control bleeding during surgery. Similar in design to both pliers and scissors, it is used to clamp exposed blood vessels shut.

Hemostats belong to a group of instruments that pivot (similar to scissors, and including needle holders, tissue holders, and some other clamps) where the structure of the tip determines the tool's function.

A hemostat has handles that can be held in place by their locking mechanism, which usually is a series of interlocking teeth, a few on each handle, that allow the user to adjust the clamping force of the pliers. When the tips are locked together, the force between them is about 40 N (9 lbf).

Often in the first phases of surgery, the incision is lined with hemostats on blood vessels that are awaiting ligation.

== History ==
The earliest known drawing of a pivoting surgical instrument dates from 1500 B.C. and is on a tomb at Thebes, Egypt. Later Roman bronze and steel pivot-controlled instruments were found in Pompeii. In the ninth century A.D., Abulcasis made illustrations of pivoting instruments for tooth extraction.

The concept of clamping a bleeding vessel with an instrument before tying it off is generally attributed to Galen, in the second century A.D. This method of hemostasis was largely forgotten until it was rediscovered by a French barber-surgeon, Ambroise Paré, in the 16th century. He made the predecessor to the modern hemostat and called it the Bec de Corbin (crow's beak). With it he could clamp a bleeding vessel before securing it with a ligature.

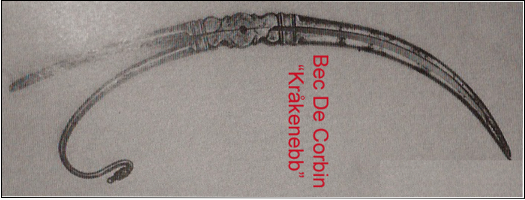
Bec de Corbin

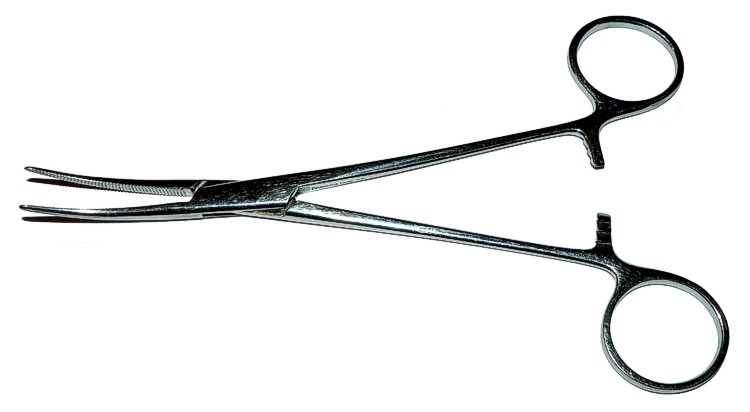
Pean forceps

Credit for the modern hemostat has been given to several persons, the foremost of whom is Jules-Émile Péan. Later surgeons, such as William Halsted, made small changes to the design.

== List of hemostats ==
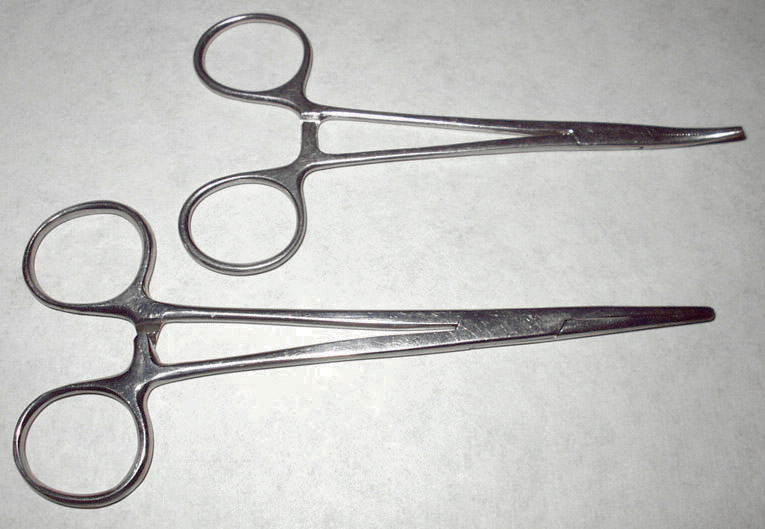
Curved and straight tip

- Rankin forceps
- Kelly forceps
- Satinsky clamps
- Kocher forceps
- Crile forceps
- Halsted Mosquito forceps
- Mixter "right angle" forceps
- Spencer Wells artery forceps (the father of all artery forceps used today)

== See also ==
- Forceps
