= Théâtre de Rosimond =

First opera house in Genava, Switzerland

Coordinates: 46°12′05″N 6°08′38″E

The Théâtre de Rosimond was Geneva's first opera house.

It was named after its manager Argus Rosimond, a Lyonnese impresario. Built in 1766, it was a wooden building, standing on the other side of Place Neuve, at the corner of the Parc des Bastions and the present-day Rue de la Croix-Rouge, for the entertainment of peacekeeping garrisons from France, Bern and Zurich, stationed in Geneva. This theatre featured three tiers of boxes and a ground-floor foyer, with an audience capacity of 800. A chandelier of tallow candles lighted the house, with a glass plate underneath it to prevent drops from falling on the audience.

During its short existence, it hosted various comedies and light operas, such as the December 1766 premiere of Isabelle et Gertrude, an operatic comédie mêlée d'ariettes by the Liégeois composer André Grétry.

No images of this theatre, either inside or outside, have survived to this day. On the night of 29 to 30 January 1768, a fire – probably arson – burned the Théâtre de Rosimond to the ground.
