= Paul Alexandre Protais =

French painter

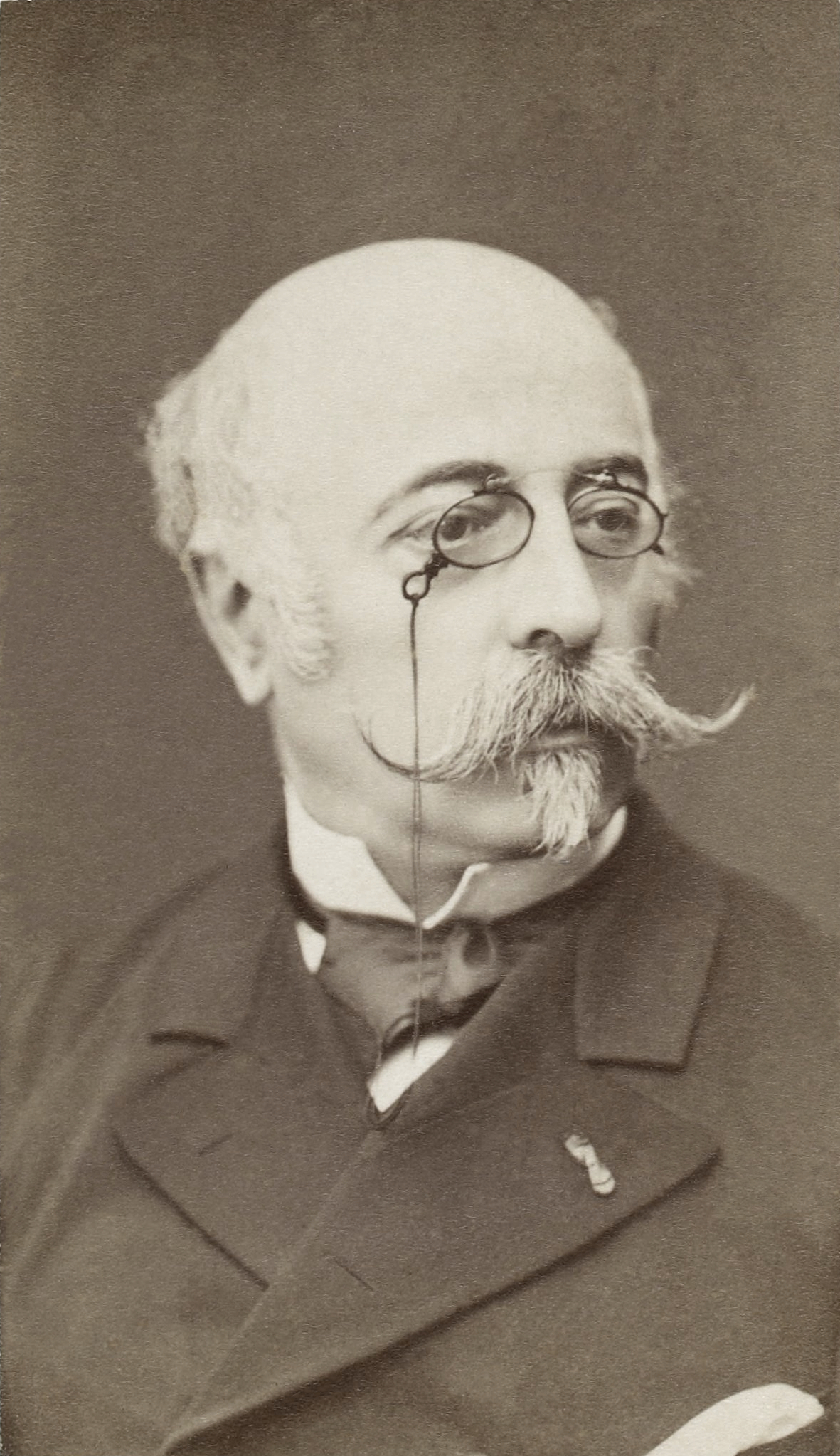
Paul Alexandre Protais

Paul Alexandre Protais (17 October 1825 – 25 January 1890) was a French artist of historical scenes, especially military and battle paintings. (He was actually born in Paris in 1825, though the notices of his time mention 1826 after an error was committed during his first exhibition at the Paris Salon.)

Born in Paris, he later became a student of Desmoulins (1788–1856). During the Crimean War, he traveled to the front and was attached to General Bosquet's staff where he compiled a portfolio of sketches of soldiers and scenes. He observed the Battle of Inkerman and made sketches which he used for a large painting showing the second charge of General Bosquet's division. Protais also was wounded during the campaign. Other war-inspired paintings from this campaign included Attaque de mamelon vert depicting a scene of the action against Sevastopol when Colonel Brancion of the 50th Regiment was killed, and a scene showing French and British troops off-duty playing ninepins. Some of the artist's Crimean sketches were also published in Illustration Journal Universal in 1855.

The artist debuted at the Paris Salon of 1850. During the campaign in Italy in 1859, he was attached to the staff of General Ladmirault, and was with the same general in 1870 during the Franco-Prussian War. He witnessed the Siege of Metz and its capitulation. He painted numerous scenes depicting the war including La Séparation (1872) and Août, 1870 (1877), and also painted a series of three pictures commissioned by the Empress Eugenie relating to the death of the Prince Imperial in the Zulu War. He died in Paris in 1890.
