= Laparotomy =

Surgical procedure to open the abdominal cavity

- Other names: Celiotomy
- Specialty: General surgery, trauma surgery

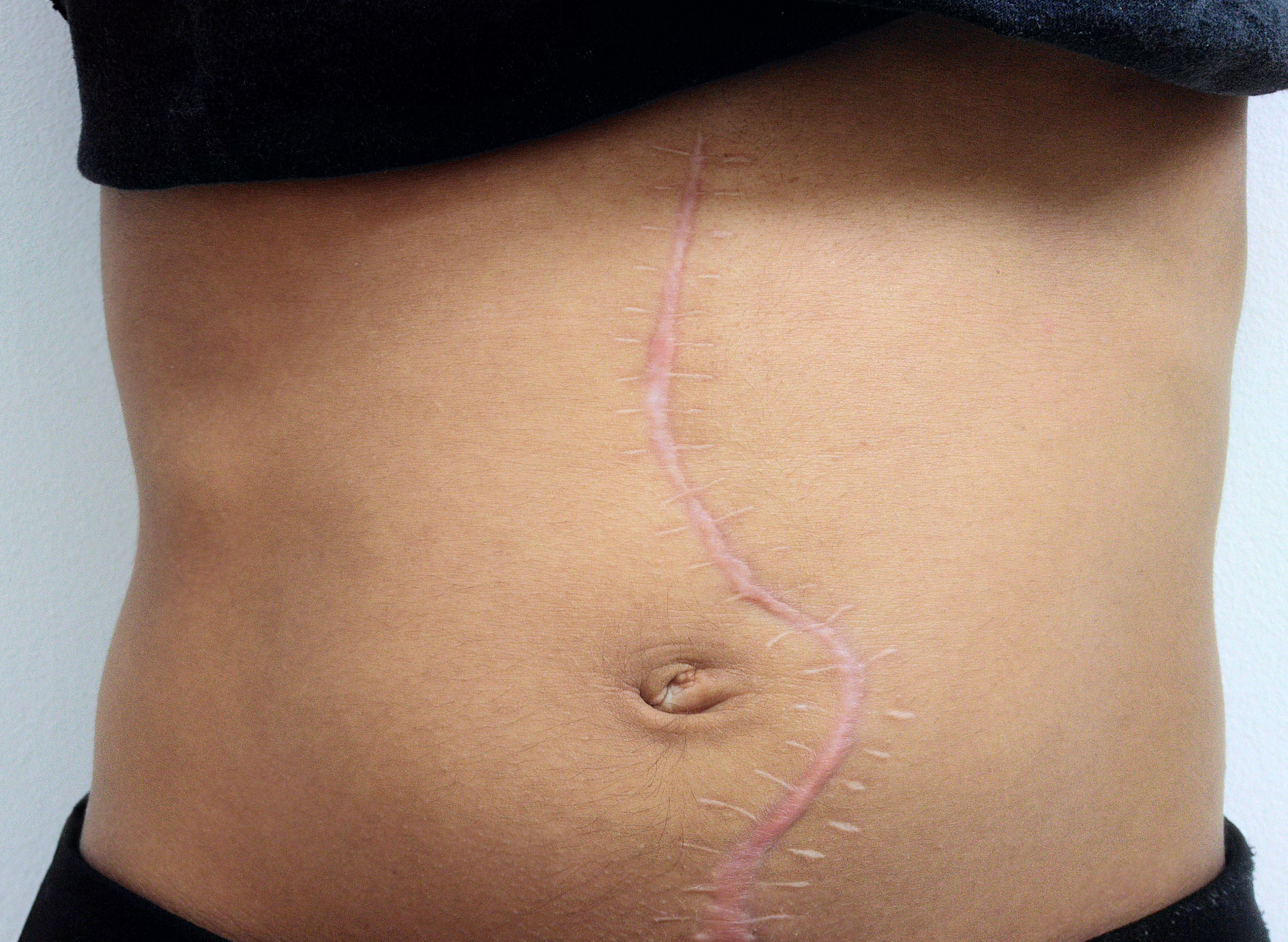
Laparotomy scar. The incision circled the umbilicus to the left so as to avoid damaging the round ligament of liver.

A laparotomy is a surgical procedure involving a surgical incision through the abdominal wall to gain access into the abdominal cavity. It is also known as a celiotomy.

== Origins and history ==
The first successful documented laparotomy was performed without anesthesia by Ephraim McDowell in 1809 in Danville, Kentucky. On July 13, 1881, George E. Goodfellow treated a miner outside Tombstone, Arizona Territory, who had been shot in the abdomen with a .32-caliber Colt revolver. Goodfellow was able to operate on the man nine days after he was shot, when he performed the first laparotomy to treat a bullet wound.

== Terminology ==
The term comes from the Greek word λᾰπάρᾱ (lapara) 'the soft part of the body between the ribs and hip, flank' and the suffix -tomy, from the Greek word τομή (tome) '(surgical) cut'.

In diagnostic laparotomy (most often referred to as an exploratory laparotomy and abbreviated ex-lap), the nature of the disease is unknown, and laparotomy is deemed the best way to identify the cause.

In therapeutic laparotomy, a cause has been identified (e.g. colon cancer) and the operation is required for its therapy.

Usually, only exploratory laparotomy is considered a stand-alone surgical operation. When a specific operation is already planned, laparotomy is considered merely the first step of the procedure.

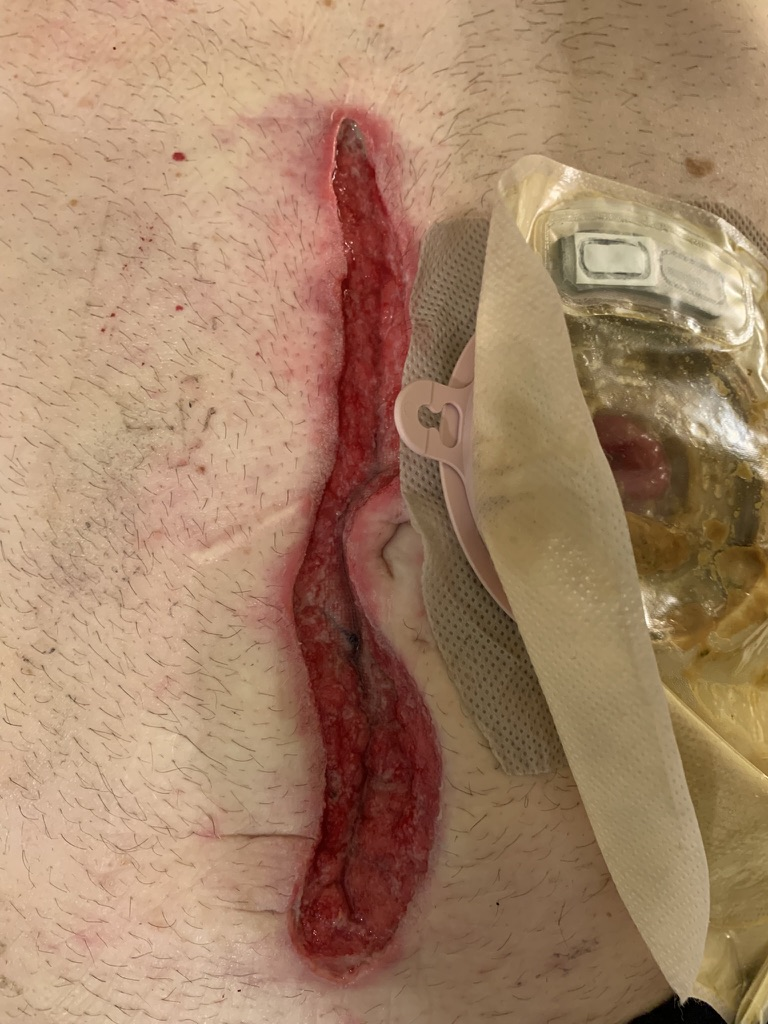
Open incision with negative-pressure wound therapy vacuum removed and corresponding ostomy system

=== Spaces accessed ===
Depending on incision placement, laparotomy may give access to any abdominal organ or space, and is the first step in any major diagnostic or therapeutic surgical procedure of these organs, which include:

- the digestive tract (the stomach, duodenum, jejunum, ileum and colon)
- the liver, pancreas, gallbladder, and spleen
- the bladder
- the prostate
- the uterus and ovaries
- the retroperitoneum (the kidneys, the aorta, abdominal lymph nodes)

== Types of incisions ==
=== Midline ===
The most common incision for laparotomy is a vertical incision in the middle of the abdomen which follows the linea alba.

- The upper midline incision usually extends from the xiphoid process to the umbilicus.
- A typical lower midline incision is limited by the umbilicus superiorly and by the pubic symphysis inferiorly.
- Sometimes a single incision extending from xiphoid process to pubic symphysis is employed, especially in trauma surgery.

Midline incisions are particularly favoured in diagnostic laparotomy, as they allow wide access to most of the abdominal cavity.

=== Midline incision ===
1. Cut (incise) the skin in midline
2. Cut (incise) subcutaneous tissue
3. Divide the linea alba (white line of the abdomen)
4. Pick up peritoneum, confirm that there is no bowel adhesion (intestinal adhesion)
5. Nick peritoneum
6. Insert finger beneath the wound to make sure that there is no adhesion
7. Cut the peritoneum with scissors

=== Other ===
Other common laparotomy incisions include:

- Kocher (right subcostal) incision (after Emil Theodor Kocher); appropriate for certain operations on the liver, gallbladder and biliary tract. This shares a name with the Kocher incision used for thyroid surgery: a transverse, slightly curved incision about 2 cm above the sternoclavicular joints.
- Davis or Rockey–Davis "muscle-splitting" right lower quadrant incision for appendectomy, named for the Oregon surgeon Alpha Eugene Rockey (1857–1927) and the Philadelphia surgeon Gwilym George Davis (1857–1918), who devised such incision style in 1905.
- Pfannenstiel incision, a transverse incision below the umbilicus and just above the pubic symphysis. In the classic Pfannenstiel incision, the skin and subcutaneous tissue are incised transversely, but the linea alba is opened longitudinally. It is the incision of choice for Cesarean section and for abdominal hysterectomy for benign disease. A variation of this incision is the Maylard incision in which the rectus abdominis muscles are sectioned transversely to permit wider access to the pelvis. This was pioneered by the Scottish surgeon Alfred Ernest Maylard (1855–1947) in 1920.
- Lumbotomy consists of a lumbar incision which permits access to the kidneys (which are retroperitoneal) without entering the peritoneal cavity. It is typically used only for benign renal lesions. It has also been proposed for surgery of the upper urological tract.
- Cherney Incision – developed in 1941 by the American uro-gynecologic surgeon Leonid Sergius Cherney (1908–1963).

== Complications following laparotomy ==
Globally, there are few studies comparing perioperative mortality following laparotomy across different health systems.

A study in the UK with more than 180,000 patients aimed to define a timeframe for quantitative futility in emergency laparotomy and investigate predictors of futility using the United Kingdom National Emergency Laparotomy Audit (NELA) database. A two-stage methodology was used; stage one defined a timeframe for futility using an online survey and steering group discussion; stage two applied this definition to patients enrolled in NELA December 2013 – December 2020 for analysis. Futility was defined as all-cause mortality within 3 days of emergency laparotomy. Results showed that quantitative futility occurred in 4% of patients (7442/180,987) and median age was 74 years. Significant predictors of futility included age, arterial lactate and cardiorespiratory co-morbidity. Frailty was associated with a 38% increased risk of early mortality and surgery for intestinal ischaemia was associated with a two times greater chance of futile surgery. These findings suggest that quantitative futility after emergency laparotomy is associated with quantifiable risk factors available to decision-makers preoperatively and should be incorporated into shared decision-making discussions with extremely high-risk patients.

There are also several national studies looking at 30-day mortality in various health systems including the United Kingdom (the National Emergency Laparotomy Audit- NELA) and Australia and New Zealand (ANZELA). One major prospective study of 10,745 adult patients undergoing emergency laparotomy from 357 centres in 58 high-, middle-, and low-income countries found that mortality is three times higher in low- compared with high-HDI countries even when adjusted for prognostic factors. In this study the overall global mortality rate was 1.6 percent at 24 hours (high 1.1 percent, middle 1.9 percent, low 3.4 percent; P < 0.001), increasing to 5.4 percent by 30 days (high 4.5 percent, middle 6.0 percent, low 8.6 percent; P < 0.001). Of the 578 patients who died, 404 (69.9 percent) did so between 24 h and 30 days following surgery (high 74.2 percent, middle 68.8 percent, low 60.5 percent). Patient safety factors were suggested to play an important role, with use of the WHO Surgical Safety Checklist associated with reduced mortality at 30 days.

Taking a similar approach, a unique global study of 1,409 children undergoing emergency laparotomy from 253 centres in 43 countries showed that adjusted mortality in children following surgery may be as high as 7 times greater in low-HDI and middle-HDI countries compared with high-HDI countries, translating to 40 excess deaths per 1000 procedures performed in these settings. Internationally, the most common operations performed were appendectomy, small bowel resection, pyloromyotomy and correction of intussusception. After adjustment for patient and hospital risk factors, child mortality at 30 days was significantly higher in low-HDI (adjusted OR 7.14 (95% CI 2.52 to 20.23), p<0.001) and middle-HDI (4.42 (1.44 to 13.56), p=0.009) countries compared with high-HDI countries.

Absorption of drugs administered orally was shown to be significantly affected following abdominal surgery.

== Related procedures ==
A related procedure is laparoscopy, where cameras and other instruments are inserted into the peritoneal cavity via small holes in the abdomen. For example, an appendectomy can be done either by a laparotomy or by a laparoscopic approach.

There is no evidence of short-term or long-term advantages for peritoneal closure during laparotomy.

== See also ==
- Exploratory laparotomy
- Spaying, veterinary surgery often done via laparotomy
- Perioperative mortality
