= LTCS =

LTCS may refer to:

- Lower segment Caesarean section
- Low temperature carbon steel
- Şanlıurfa GAP Airport (IATA: GNY, ICAO: LTCS)
