= Retractor (medicine) =

Surgical instrument to separate tissues

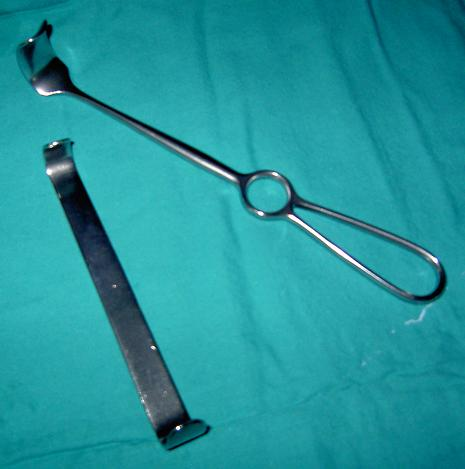
Common handheld surgical retractors

A retractor is a surgical instrument used to separate the edges of a surgical incision/wound or to hold away certain organs and tissues (i.e. to provide tissue retraction) so that body parts underneath may be accessed during surgical operations.

The broad term retractor typically describes a simple steel tool possessing a curved, hooked, or angled blade, which is manually manipulated to help maintain a desired position of tissue during surgery. More sophisticated retractors may be clamped in place (usually to a tableside frame) or suspended at the end of a robotic arm. Retractors can also be "self-retaining" and no longer need to be held once inserted, having two or more opposing blades or hooks which are separated via spring, ratchet, worm gear or other method. The term retractor is also used to describe distinct, hand-cranked devices such as rib spreaders (also known as thoracic retractors, or distractors) with which surgeons may use to forcefully drive tissues apart to obtain exposure. Different surgery specialties can have specific kinds of retractors – e.g., for certain kinds of spinal surgery, such as Minimally Invasive Transforaminal Lumbar Interbody Fusions, some retractors are fitted both with suction and with fiberoptic lights to keep deep surgical wounds both dry and illuminated.

Surgical assistants, whether they be another surgeon, surgical residents or professionally trained procedure assistants (specifically Certified Surgical Assistants, Registered Nurse First Assistants, Physicians Assistants, or Surgical Technologists), may assist the operating surgeon in the process of retraction.

== History ==
Surgical retractors probably originate with very basic tools used in the Stone Age. Branches or antlers of various shapes were used to dig and extract food from the ground. As the use of tools evolved, a variety of instruments came about to substitute for the use of hooked or grasping fingers in the butchering of meat or dissection of bodies. The use of metals in tool making was of great importance. A variety of Roman metal instruments of the hook and retractor family have been found by archeologists. These instruments would generally be called hooks if the end was as narrow as the handle of the instrument. If the end was broad, it would be called a retractor. Also arising from this group of tools were other related tools for displacing (elevators and spatulas) and scooping (spoons and curettes).

In 4th century CE, Indian physician Susruta used surgical tools such as retractors. In a description of the procedure of tonsillectomy from the 7th century CE, Paul of Aegina documents the use of a tongue spatula to keep the tongue out of the way while a form of tonsil hook is used to bring the tonsil forward for excision. In 1000 CE Abu al-Qasim al-Zahrawi, also known as Albucasis or Abulcasis, described a variety of surgical instruments including retractors in his famous text Al-Tasrif. Vesalius described a variety of hooks and retractors in the 16th century. Jan Mikulicz-Radecki's invention of a hinged rib spreading retractor in 1904 prompted a flurry of development of retractors in the early 20th century, culminating in 1936 in our modern device based on the design of Enrique Finochietto.

== Current ==
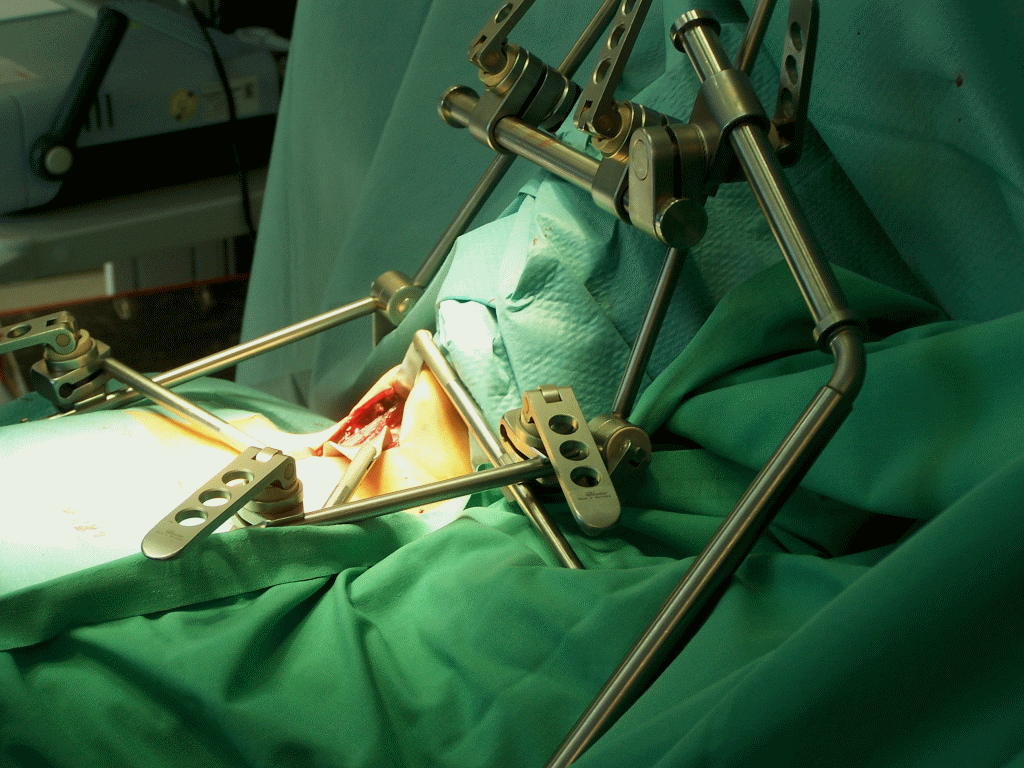
A retractor system setup in place for undertaking a thyroid surgery intervention.

The following is an incomplete list of surgical retractors in use:

In 2021, a self-retaining ring retractor in the UK was given The Queen's Award for Enterprise in the Innovation category as the first and only retractor ever to be awarded.

=== Hand-held retractors ===
- Hohmann Retractor
- Lahey Retractor
- Senn Retractor
- Blair (Rollet) Retractor
- Rigid Rake
- Flexible Rake
- "Cat's Paws" – sharp, wide rakes
- Ragnell Retractor
- Linde-Ragnell Retractor
- Davis Retractor
- Volkman Retractor
- Farabeuf Retractor
- Mathieu Retractor
- Jackson Tracheal Hook
- Meyerding Finger Retractor
- Little Retractor
- Love Nerve Retractor
- Green Retractor
- Goelet Retractor
- Cushing Vein Retractor
- Langenbeck Retractor
- Richardson Retractor
- Richardson-Eastmann Retractor
- Deaver Retractor
- Doyen Retractor
- Parker Retractor
- Parker-Mott Retractor
- Roux Retractor
- Mayo-Collins Retractor
- "Army-Navy" Retractor
- Ribbon Retractor – malleable, able to be bent as the surgeon desires

=== Self-retaining retractors ===
- Rultract Skyhook Retractor System
- Alms Retractor
- Lone Star Retractor
- Galaxy II retractor
- Gelpi Retractor
- Gutow Retractor
- Weitlaner Retractor
- Beckman-Weitlaner Retractor
- Beckman-Eaton Retractor
- Beckman Retractor
- Balfour Retractor – typically used in lower abdomen and pelvic surgery
- Rib spreader (a.k.a. Finochietto retractor)
- Travers Retractor
- West Retractor
- Norfolk & Norwich Retractor

== Gallery ==
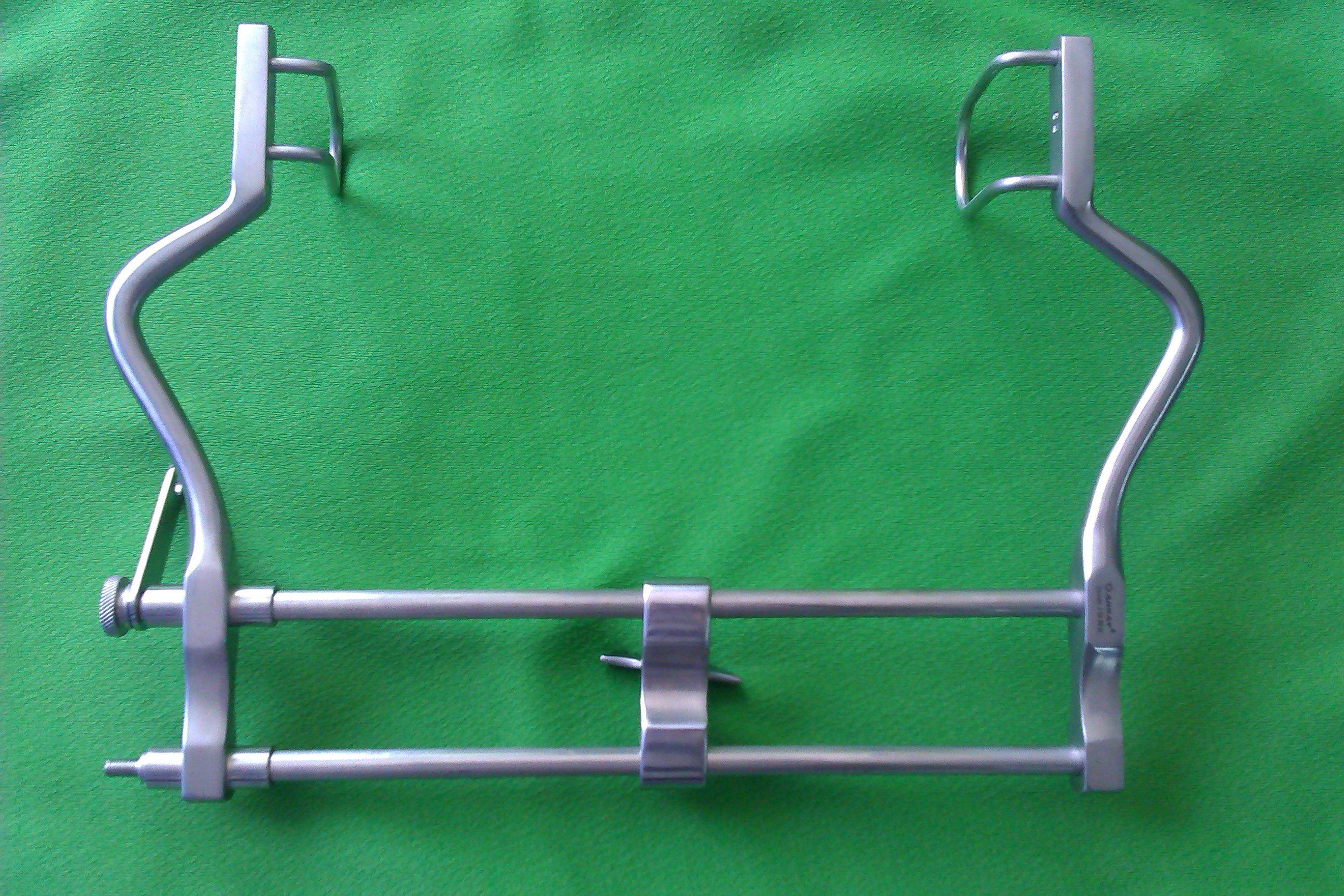
Balfour retractor

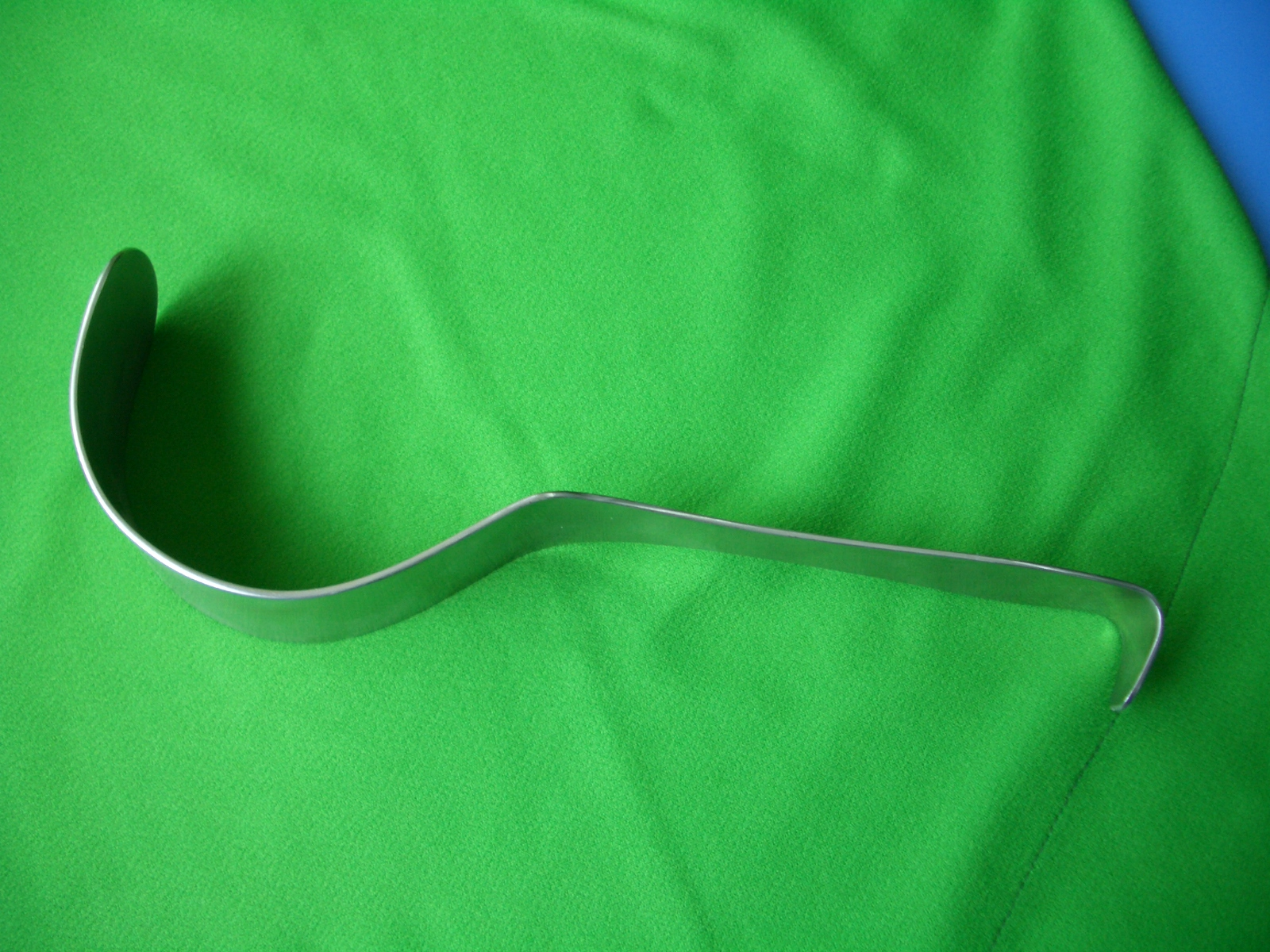
Deaver retractor

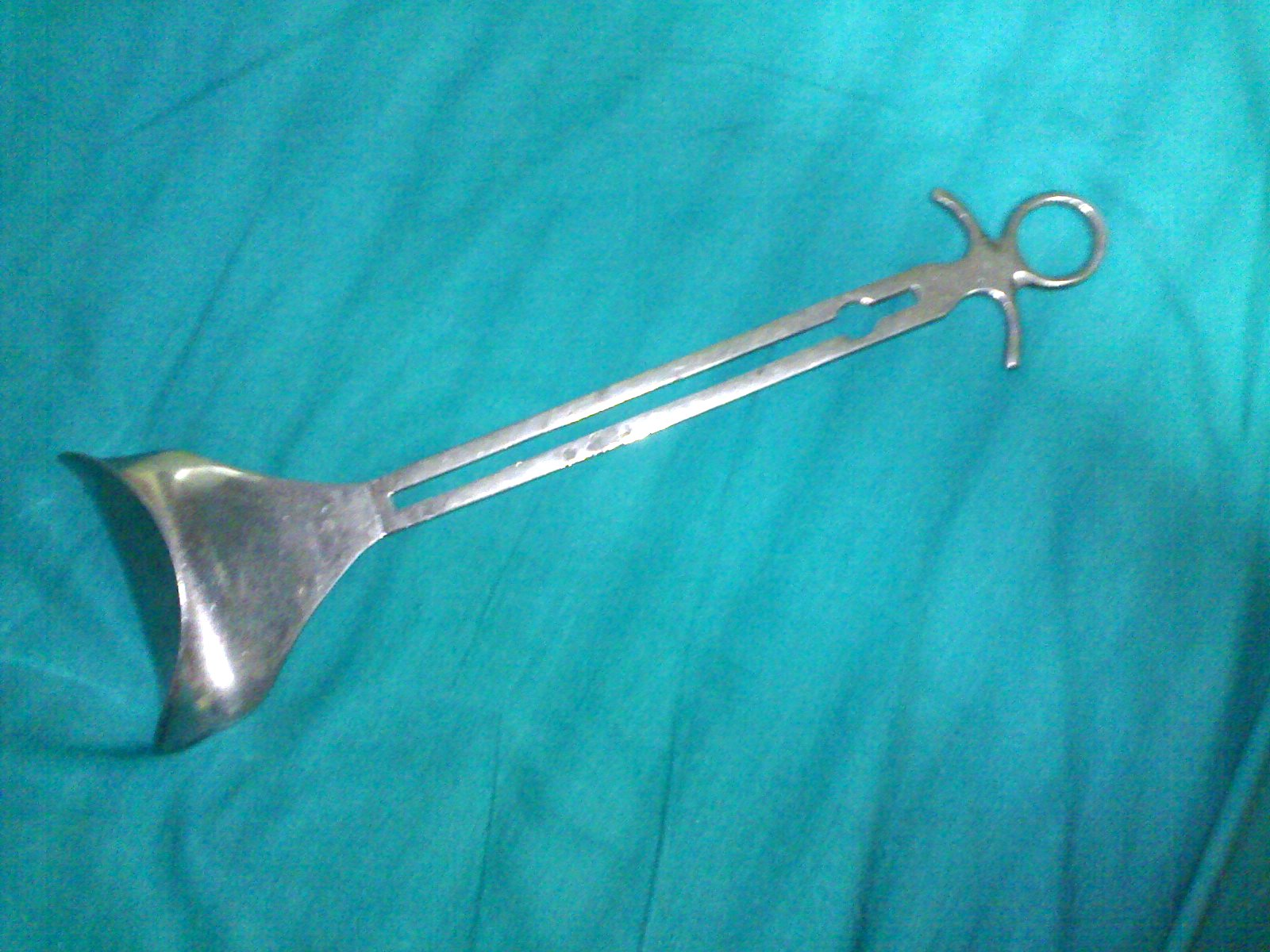
Doyen retractor (abdominal)

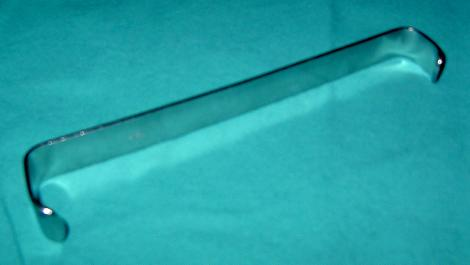
Farabeuf retractor

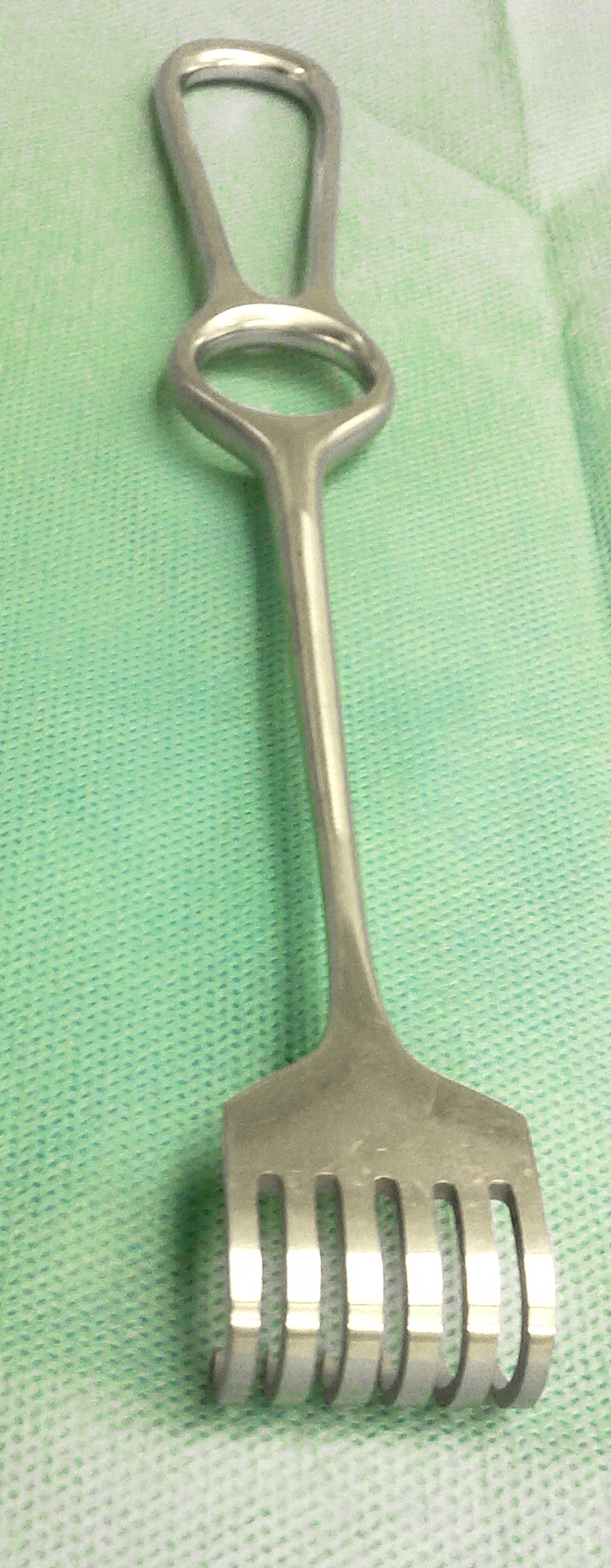
Volkmann retractor (informally known as "rake")

Amputation retractor
