= LSCS =

LSCS may refer to:

- Lone Star College System
- Lower segment Caesarean section
- La Salle Computer Society, a professional student organization in De La Salle University College of Computer Studies
