= Cherney incision =

Incision used in gynecological surgery

The Cherney incision is an incision used in gynecologic surgery. It is similar to the Pfannenstiel incision but allows access to the space of Retzius and gives a larger area in which to operate.

== Technique ==
The Cherney incision begins when the skin is cut 2-3 centimeters above the pubic symphysis and the surgeon dissects down to the rectus abdominis muscle. The surgeon then uses blunt dissection with the fingers to separate the tendons from the overlying fascia before cutting the tendons 1-2 centimeters above the pubic symphysis. The muscles are then lifted away, toward the patient's head (cephalad). Then, the peritoneum can be cut and the surgery can proceed.

== Complications ==
Complications can ensue. If surgical retractors are not placed carefully under the edges of the incision, they can damage the femoral nerve or other nerves in the area. If during wound closure, tendons are sewn directly to the pubic symphysis, osteitis pubis or osteomyelitis can result.
