= Surgical incision =

Cut made into the skin for the purpose of surgery

A surgical incision is a cut made through the skin and soft tissue to facilitate an operation or procedure. Often, multiple incisions are possible for an operation, and one must be chosen by the surgeon. Sometimes these choices are made based on preference, but also to avoid predictable problems, such as putting a new incision close to a recent one, which can compromise the blood flow to the skin in between the two incisions.

In general, a surgical incision is made as small and unobtrusive as possible to facilitate safe and timely operating conditions and recovery. In the words of the Nobel Prize winning physician Emil Theodor Kocher, a surgical incision "must be as long as necessary and as short as possible". Correct placement can reduce the length of the incision.

== Anatomy ==
Incisions of the neck, chest, and abdomen. Key as follows: A. Carotid incision B. Thyroidectomy incision C. Tracheotomy incision D. Subclavicular incision E. Sternotomy incision F. Infraareolar incision (either side) G. Inframamary incision (either side) H. Clamshell incision I. Kocher / subcostal incision J. Mercedes Benz incision K. Paramedian incision (either side) L. Chevron incision M. Epigastrin / upper midline incision O. McBurney's / gridiron incision (right side only — for appendectomy) P. Rockey-Davis / Lanz incision (right side only - for appendectomy) Q. Supraumbilical incision R. Infraumbilical incision S. Pararectus incision T. Maylard incision U. Pfannenstiel / Kerr / pubic incision V. Gibson incision (either side, but conventionally left) W. Midline incision X. Inguinal incision Y. Femoral incision Z. Turner-Warwick's incision

Surgical incisions are planned based on the expected extent of exposure needed for the specific operation planned. Within each region of the body, several incisions are common.

=== Head and neck ===
- Wilde's incision – This post-aural incision is used for a variant mastoiditis drainage, and was named after Sir William Wilde, an ENT surgeon in Dublin who first described it at the end of the nineteenth century. His son, Oscar Wilde's, death was stated by his doctors to be due to meningitis stemming from an ear infection. He had recently had an operation, believed by some to be a mastoidectomy.

=== Chest ===
- Median sternotomy – This is the primary incision used for cardiac procedures. It extends from the sternal notch to the xiphoid process. The sternum is divided, and a Finochietto retractor used to keep the incision open.
- Thoracotomy – A division of the ribs from the side of the chest.

=== Abdomen and pelvis ===
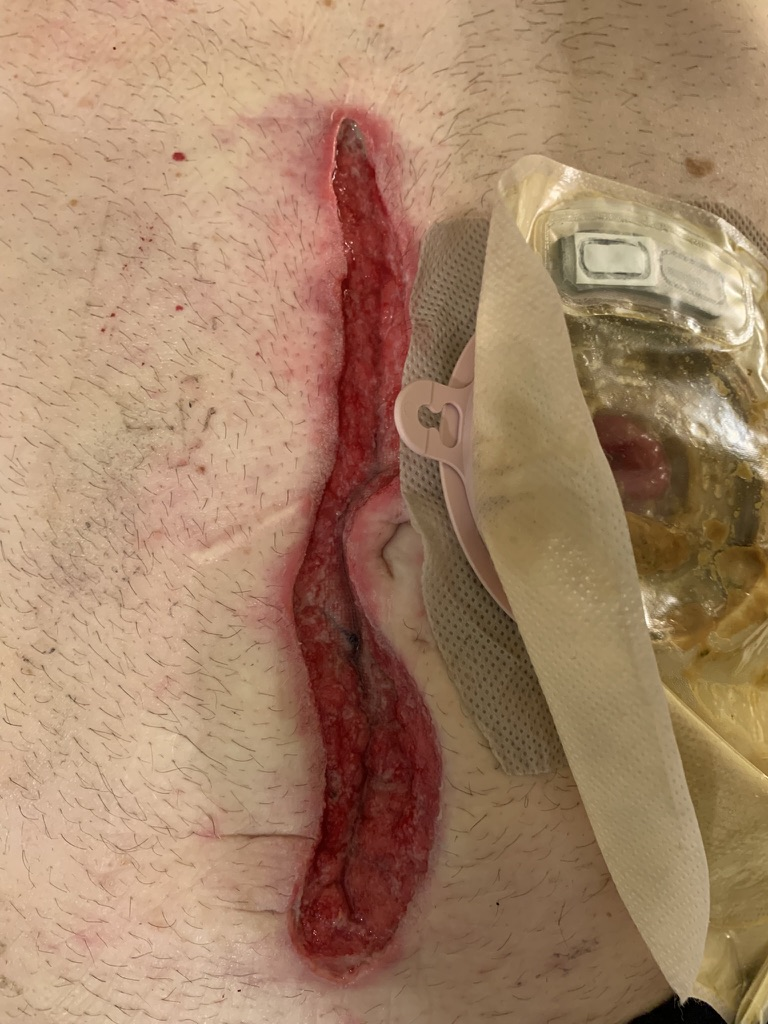
Open mid-line incision with negative-pressure wound therapy vacuum removed

Incisions used for caesarean section Is: Supra-umbilical incision Im: Median incision IM: Maylard incision IP: Pfannenstiel incision

When feasible, the incision site is chosen based on a tentative diagnosis arrived at by first listening to an account of the circumstances, then looking for medical signs, gently feeling the affected area, and obtaining relevant imaging.

- Midline incision or midline laparotomy – The most common incision for laparotomy is the midline incision, a vertical incision which follows the linea alba. Midline incisions are particularly favoured in diagnostic laparotomy, as they allow wide access to most of the abdominal cavity. In this case, they are sometimes called the incision of indecision, as they are broadly useful for a variety of purposes, and so appropriate when the diagnosis is unclear.
  - The upper midline incision usually extends from the xiphoid process to the umbilicus.
  - A typical lower midline incision is limited by the umbilicus superiorly and by the pubic symphysis inferiorly.
  - Sometimes a single incision extending from xiphoid process to pubic symphysis is employed, especially in trauma surgery. Typically, a smooth curve is made around the umbilicus.
- Pfannenstiel incision, Kerr incision, or Pfannenstiel-Kerr incision is the lower transverse incision made in the lower segment of uterus below the umbilicus and just above the pubic symphysis. It is commonly used in Caesarian section and for abdominal hysterectomy for benign disease. In the classic Pfannenstiel incision, the skin and subcutaneous tissue are incised transversally, but the linea alba is opened vertically.
- Chevron incision – This incision is a cut made on the abdomen below the rib cage. The cut starts under the mid-axillary line below the ribs on the right side of the abdomen and continues all the way across the abdomen to the opposite mid-axillary line thereby the whole width of the abdomen is cut to provide access to the liver. The average length of the incision is approximately 24 to 30 inches. If extended with a third branch upwards, it is called a Mercedes incision, after the Mercedes-Benz logo.
- Cherney incision – Cherney described a transverse incision that allows excellent surgical exposure to the space of Retzius and the pelvic sidewall. The curvilinear skin and rectus fascial incision is made 2 finger breadths above the symphysis pubis and carried in Langer's lines from 2 fingerbreadths medial to one anterior superior iliac spine to the corresponding position medial to the opposite anterior superior iliac spine. The anterior rectus fascia is mobilized distally off the underlying rectus muscle bodies. The pyramidalis muscles are dissected free and sharply excised to expose the underlying rectus tendons. With an index finger, a plane is developed between the fibrous tendons of the rectus muscle and the underlying transversalis fascia. Using a sharp no.10 scalpel blade, the rectus tendons are transected transversely 1–2 cm distal to the superior edge of the pubic bone. Rectus muscle should never be cut. The rectus muscles are retracted and the peritoneum opened. The inferior epigastric vessels may need division. Closure is accomplished with 5 to 6 horizontal mattress sutures of permanent braided suture approximating the anterior rectus tendons to the intact distal anterior rectus fascia. Continuous monofilament suture closure of lateral edges of the rectus muscle to the anterior rectus fascia prevents hernia. Patients should wear a binder for at least 2 weeks. No incision provides wider pelvic exposure, and is relatively painless compared to midline incisions. Result is the most pleasing cosmetic result of any abdominal incision.
- Kocher's incision – An oblique incision made in the right upper quadrant of the abdomen, classically used for open cholecystectomy. Named after Emil Theodor Kocher. It is appropriate for certain operations on the liver, gallbladder and biliary tract. This shares a name with the Kocher incision used for thyroid surgery: a transverse, slightly curved incision about 2 cm above the sternoclavicular joints;
- Kustner’s incision – A transverse incision is made 5 cm above the symphysis pubis but below the anterior iliac spine. The subcutaneous tissue is then separated in the midline and the linea alba is exposed. A vertical midline incision is made through the linea alba. Care is taken to control and ligate any branches of the superficial epigastric vessels. This step of the incision is usually time consuming and is one of the limitations associated. This type of incision offers little extensibility and less exposure than a Pfannestiel incision.
- Lanz incision – A variation of the traditional Mc Burney's incision, which was made at McBurney's point on the abdomen: The Lanz incision is made at the same point along the transverse plane and deemed cosmetically better. It is typically used to perform an open appendectomy. Variations exist on the method used to locate the incision. Some surgeons advocate that the incision is made approximately 2 cm below the umbilicus centered on mid-clavicular-midinguinal line. Others imply use of McBurney's point to center the incision (1/3rd of the distance from the anterior superior iliac spine to the umbilicus).
- Maylard incision – A variation of Pfannenstiel incision is the Maylard incision in which the rectus abdominis muscles are sectioned transversally to permit wider access to the pelvis. The Maylard incision is also called the Mackenrodt incision. The incision in the rectus muscles is performed with the help of cautery, scalpel or surgical stapler. It is important to identify the inferior epigastric vessels on the lateral surface of these muscles and ensure their isolation and ligation if the incision will span more than half the rectus muscle width. It is advisable not to separate the rectus muscles from the anterior rectus sheath to prevent their retraction, which in turn facilitates closure at the end of the procedure. Among the complications associated with this type of incision is delayed bleeding from the cut edges of the rectus muscles as well as the deep epigastric vessels. Furthermore, depending on the patient's body habitus, this incision may not offer adequate exposure to the upper abdomen.
- McBurney incision / gridiron incision – Described in 1894 by McBurney, used for appendectomy. An oblique incision made in the right lower quadrant of the abdomen, classically used for appendectomy. Incision is placed perpendicular to the spinoumblical line at McBurney's point, i.e. at the junction of lateral one-third and medial two-thirds of spino-umblical line. This is the incision used for open appendectomy, it begins 2 to 5 centimeters above the anterior superior iliac spine and continues to a point one-third of the way to the umbilicus (McBurney's point). Thus, the incision is parallel to the external oblique muscle of the abdomen which allows the muscle to be split in the direction of its fibers, decreasing healing times and scar tissue formation. This incision heals rapidly and generally has good cosmetic results, especially if a subcuticular suture is used to close the skin.
- McEvedy's incision – McEvedy's original incision was a lateral paramedian incision which used to incise the rectus sheath along its lateral margin and gain access by pulling the rectus medially. This incision became obsolete because of very high incisional hernia rate. A modification was introduced by Nyhus which used a transverse (oblique) skin incision 3 cm above the inguinal ligament and a transverse incision (oblique) to divide the anterior rectus sheath. The rectus muscle was then pulled medially. This modification prevented the high incisional hernia rate.
- Turner-Warwick's incision – This type of incision is placed 2 cm above the symphysis pubis and within the lateral borders of the rectus muscles. The sheath overlying the rectus muscles at the symphysis pubis is released, 4 cm transversely, and the incision angled up to the lateral borders of the rectus muscles. The lateral edges of the incisions remain medial to the internal oblique muscles. The sheath may be released off the aponeurosis with the help of traction applied using Kocker clamps. The pyramidalis muscles are typically left attached to the aponeurosis. The rectus muscles are separated and the incision is made in the midline. This type of incision is good for exposure of the retropubic space but offers limited access to the upper pelvis and abdomen.

=== Eye ===
- Radial keratotomy – Used in eye surgery: corneal microincisions made to flatten the cornea and correct myopia.

== Instrumentation ==
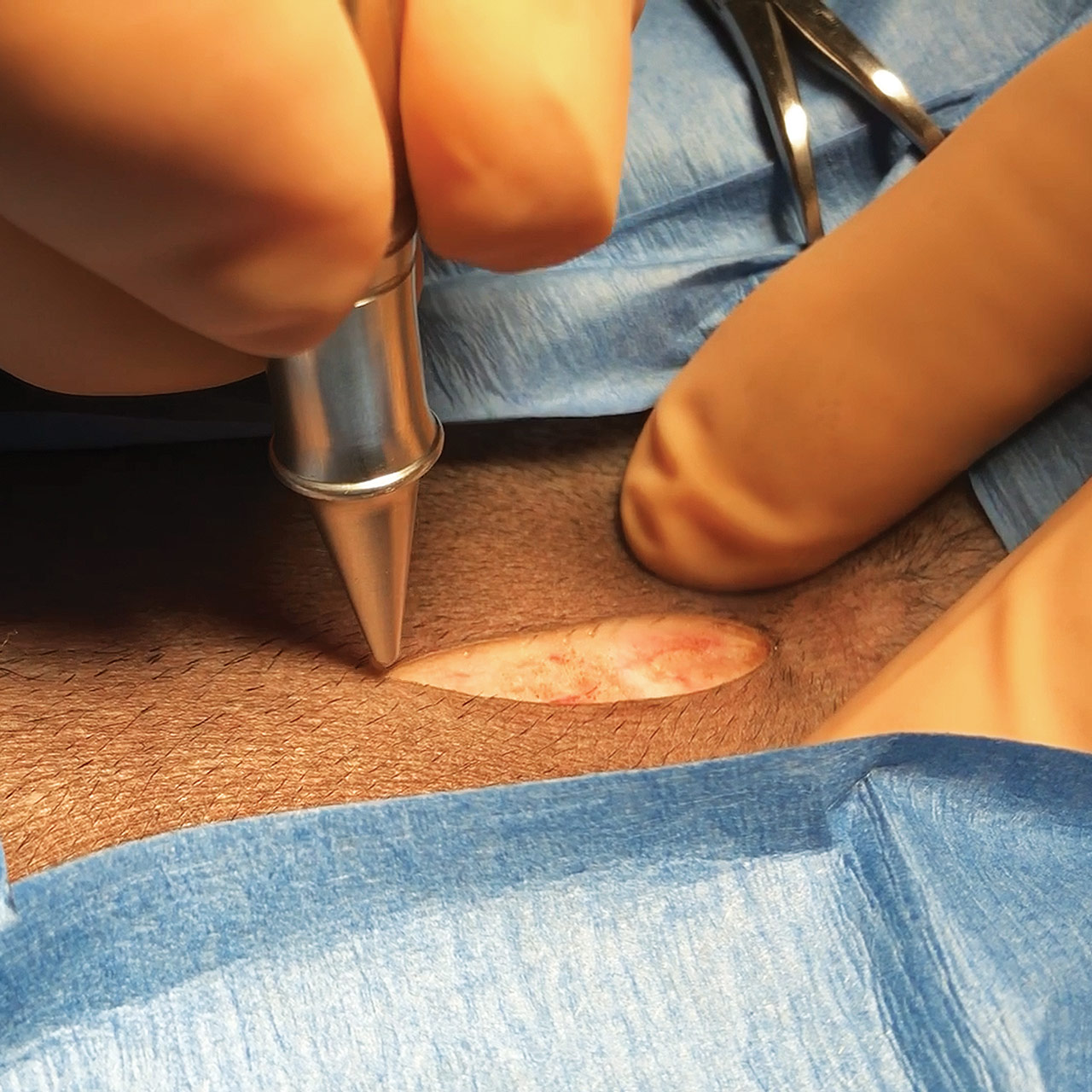
Abdominal incision created with a LightScalpel 10,600 nm CO_{2} laser handpiece, demonstrating a precise, bloodless tissue cut in the lower abdomen.

A variety of instruments may be used to create surgical incisions:

- Scalpel: traditional stainless-steel or disposable blades for sharp dissection.
- Electrocautery: monopolar or bipolar devices that cut tissue while achieving simultaneous hemostasis.
- Ultrasonic (piezoelectric) devices: use high-frequency vibrations to selectively cut mineralized tissue such as bone.
- Laser: coherent light sources tuned to specific tissue interactions.
  - CO_{2} lasers: strongly absorbed by water, creating a very shallow penetration depth and a narrow cutting zone, enabling high precision and reliable hemostasis.
  - Diode lasers: absorbed by hemoglobin and melanin, yielding penetration depths on the order of millimeters and a broader thermal damage zone.
  - Erbium lasers: efficiently ablate water-rich tissues with high spatial precision, but their limited coagulative effect provides minimal hemostasis when cutting small vessels.

== See also ==
- Surgical positions
