= Lower segment Caesarean section =

Type of caesarean section

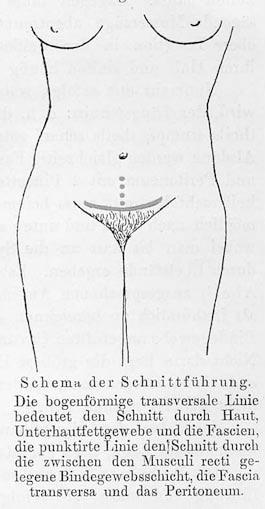
- First description of Pfannenstiel's incision.
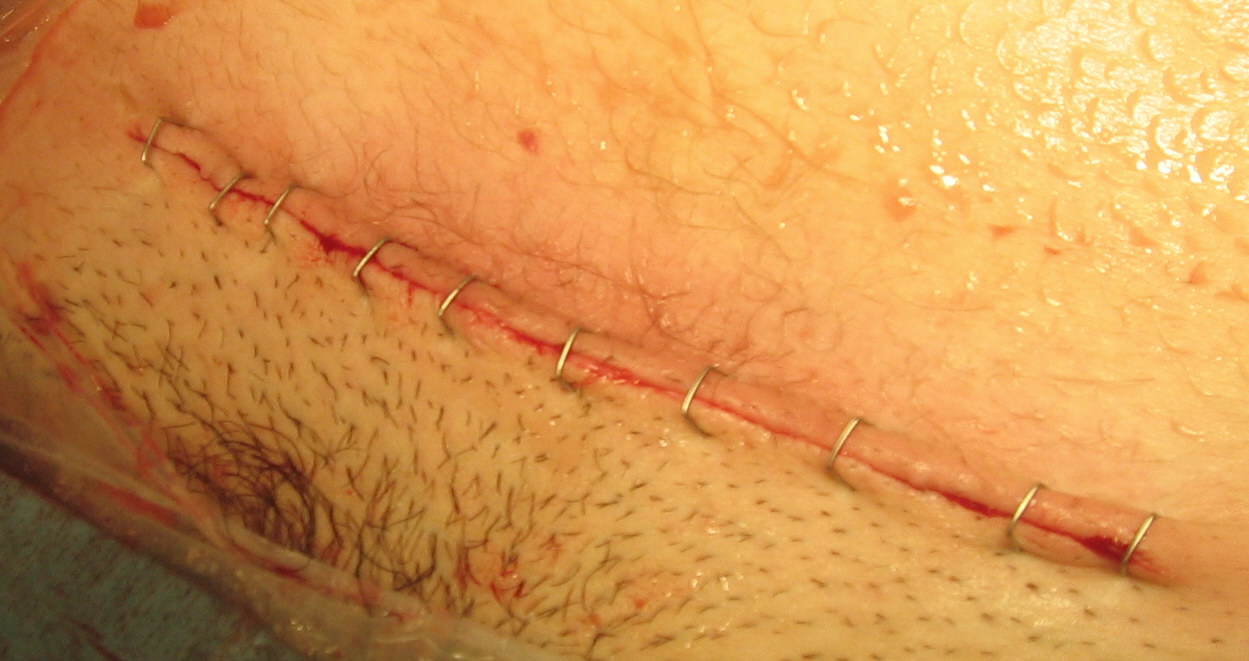
- A Pfannenstiel incision for a caesarian section closed with surgical staples. The superior aspect of mons pubis and pubic hair are seen at bottom of the image.

A lower (uterine) segment caesarean section (LSCS), also known as the lower-segment transverse cesarean section, is the most commonly used type of caesarean section, involving a horizontal incision. This procedure is used in order to safely deliver a baby when a vaginal birth is deemed unsafe, involving a horizontal incision at the pubic hair line.

Comparison of incisions used for caesarean section Is: Supra-umbilical incision Im: Median incision IM: Maylard incision IP: Pfannenstiel incision

Most commonly, a baby is delivered by making a transverse incision in the lower uterine segment, above the attachment of the urinary bladder to the uterus. This type of incision results in less blood loss and is easier to repair after surgery compared to other types of caesarean sections. This type of incision was developed by the German gynecologist Hermann Johannes Pfannenstiel, who was critical in the development of modern day lower segment cesarean sections, due to his development of this technique, which he gained credit for. There are several methods of operation used in order to maximize the safety of the procedure, which are disussed in detail below.

== Method ==
A vertical incision in the lower uterine segment may be performed in the following circumstances:

- presence of lateral varicosities
- constriction ring to cut through it
- deeply engaged head

The location of an lower segment cesarean section is beneficial for the following reasons:

- peritoneum is more loosely attached to the uterus
- There is significantly less bleeding
- healing is more efficient
- sutures are intact (less problem with suture loosening)

Most bleeding takes place from the angles of the incision, and forceps can be applied to control it. Green Armytage forceps are specifically designed for this purpose.

As a result of the first incision, the bladder is exposed and scissors are used to open the uterus, allowing just enough room to deliver the baby. Any unnecessary incision made could cause unnecessary blood loss. Although the incision is made using a sharp scalpel, care must be taken not to injure the foetus, especially if the membranes are ruptured, or in emergencies like abruption. The incision can be extended to either sides using scissors or by blunt dissection using hands. While using the scissors, the surgeon should ensure that a finger is placed underneath the uterus so that the foetus in protected from unintentional injury. If blunt dissection is done, intraoperative blood loss can be minimized. In cases where Pfannenstiel incision cannot be done (such as large baby), Kronig incision (low vertical incision), classical (midline), J or T-shaped incisions may be used to incise the uterus. This type of C-section can allow the woman’s body to heal faster following surgery. It also lessens the likelihood of developing a hernia post-operation. Lower-segment cesarean sections are less damaging, and cause fewer complications in future pregnancies, allowing women to choose a vaginal delivery for future births.

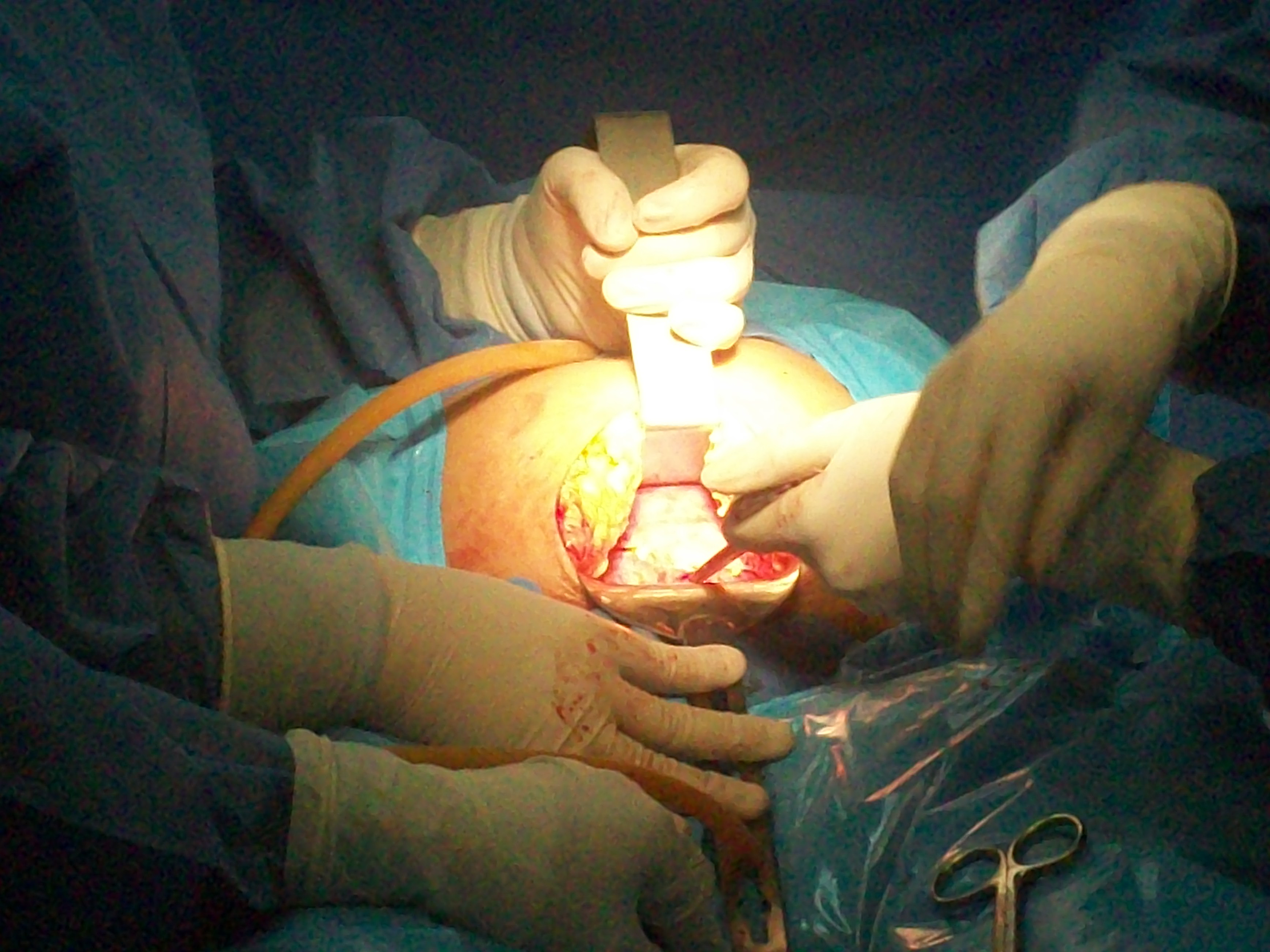
Abdominal wall incision that exposes anterior wall of the uterus

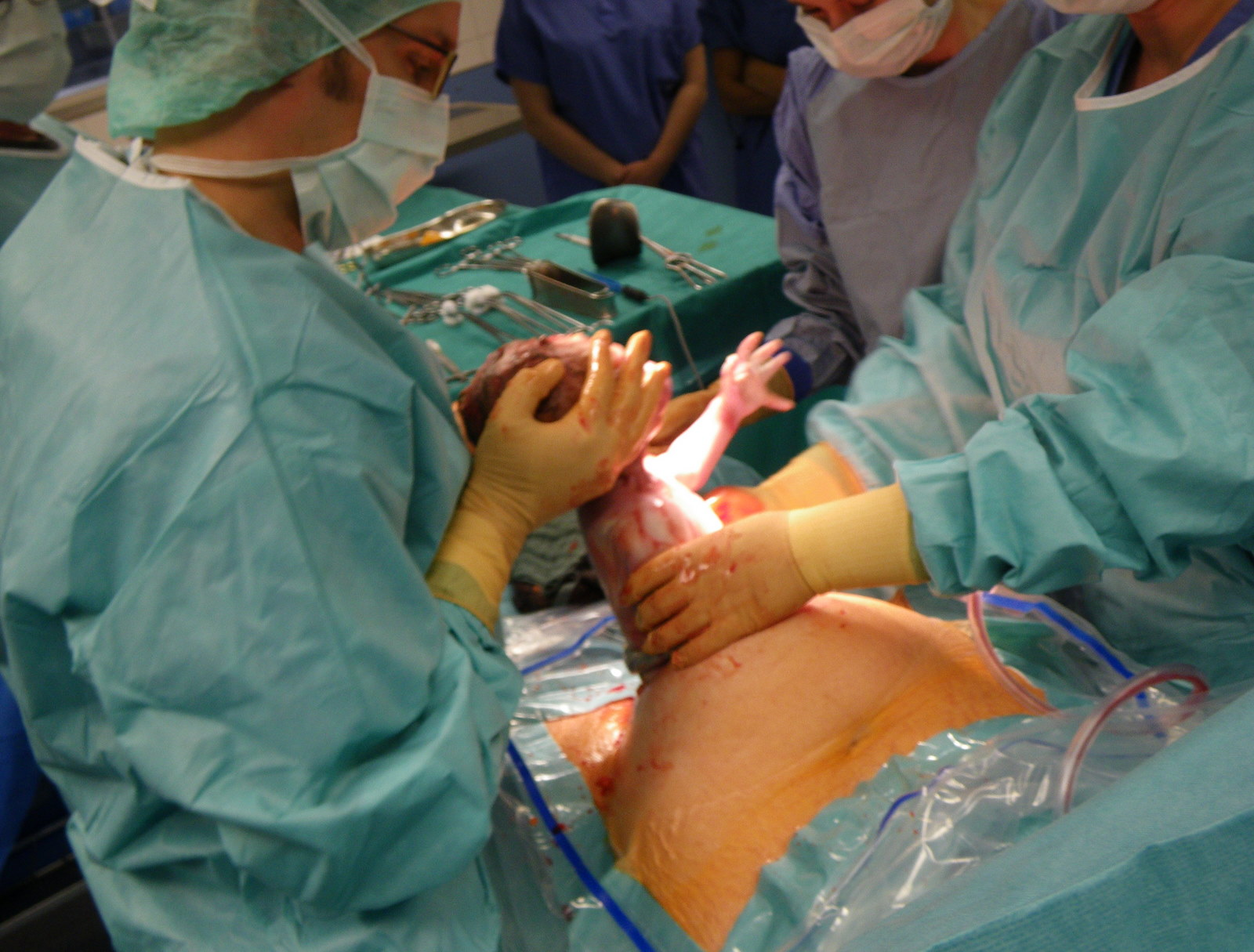
Pulling out the baby

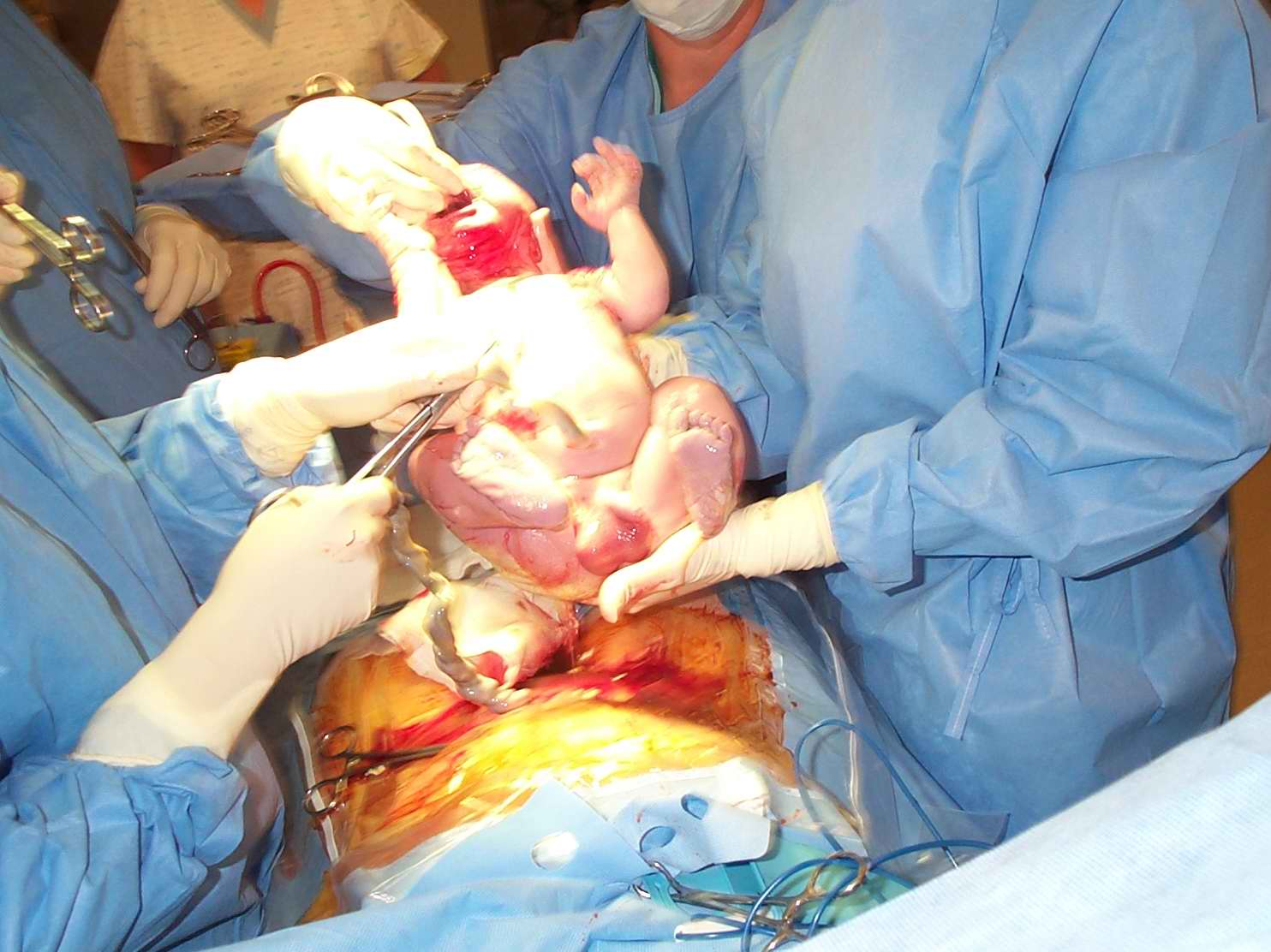
Complete extraction of the baby from the uterus

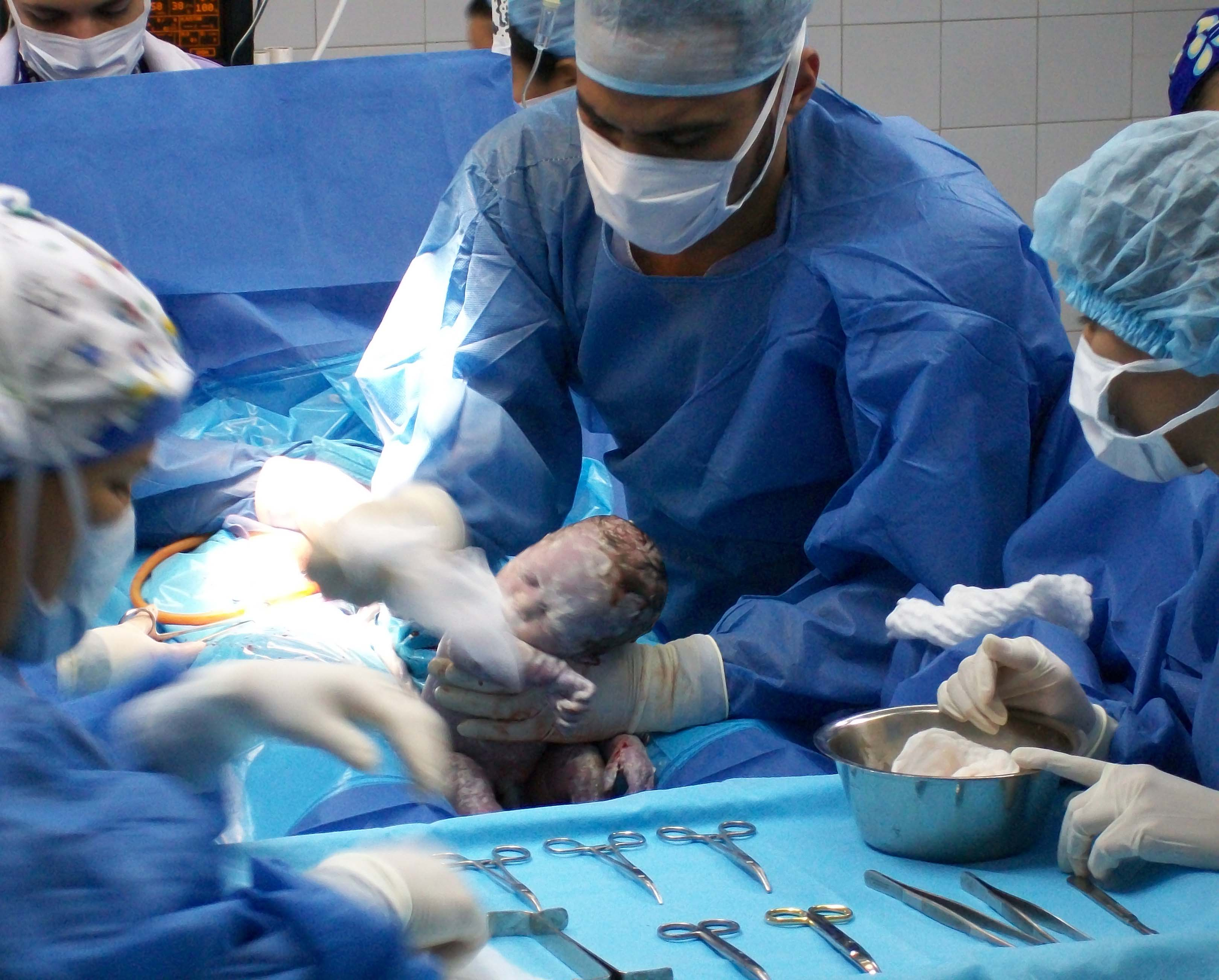
Cleaning prior to handing the newborn to the pediatrics team

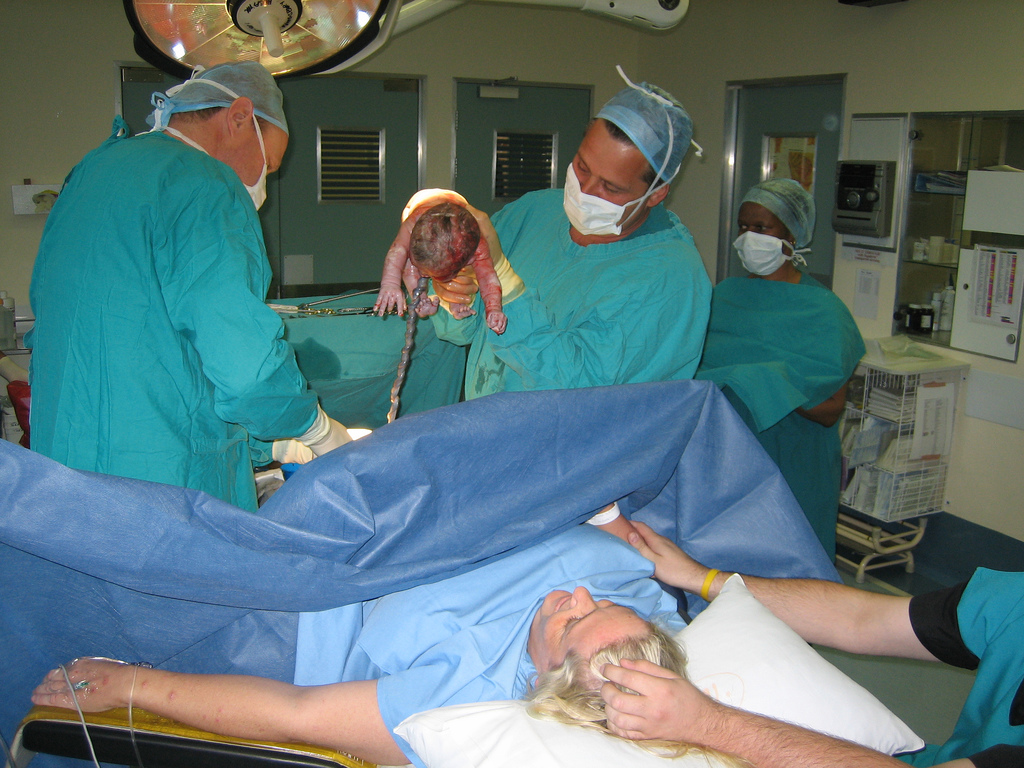
Showing the baby to its mother

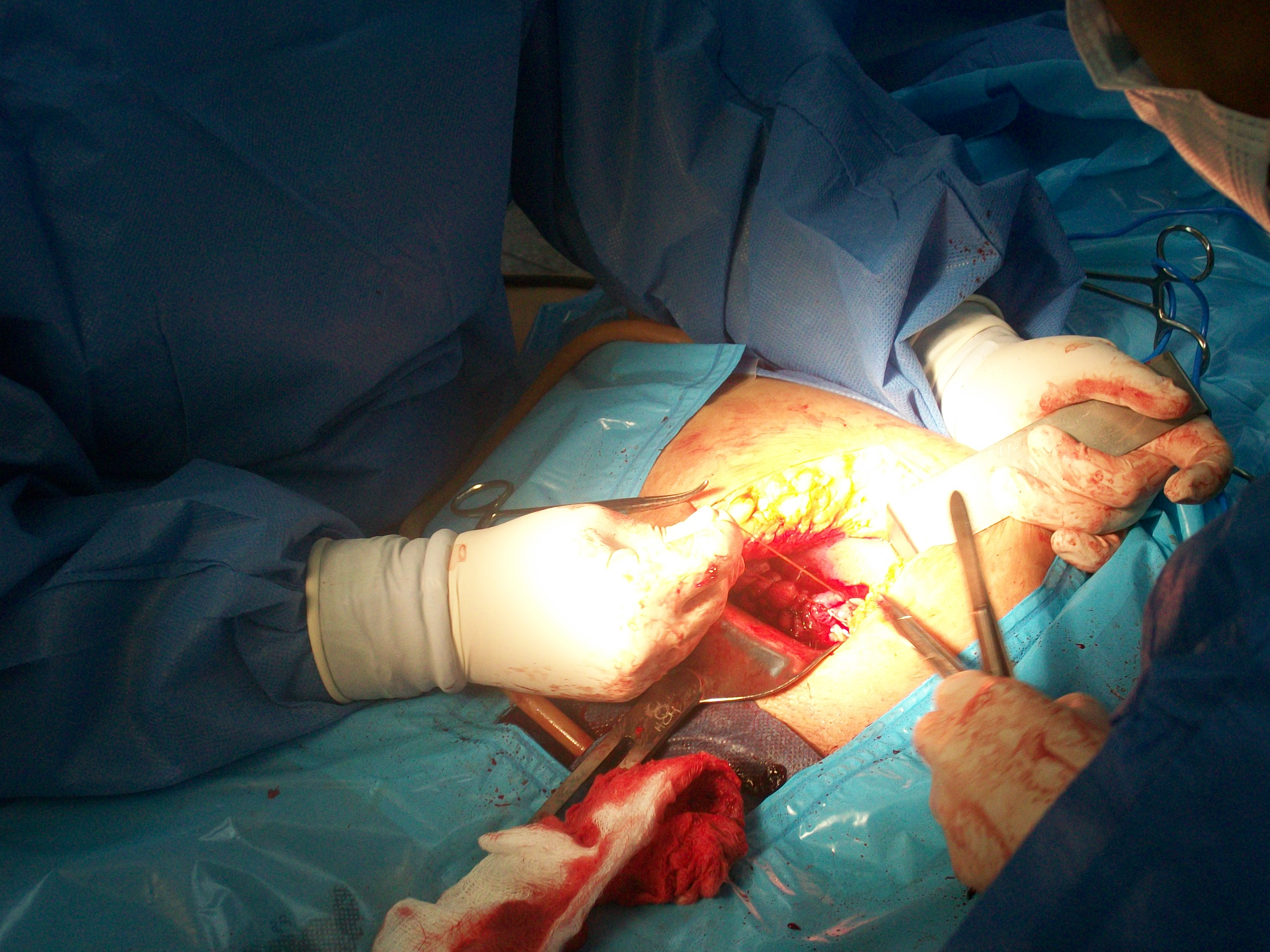
Suturing the uterus

== Etymology ==
The German gynecologist Hermann Johannes Pfannenstiel (1862–1909) invented the technique. In the United Kingdom, the surgery was first popularised by Dr. Monroe Kerr, who first used it in 1911, so in English speaking countries it is sometimes called the Kerr incision or the Pfannenstiel-Kerr incision.

== History ==
Kerr published the results in 1920, proposing that this method would cause less damage to the vascularized areas of uterus than the classical operation. He claimed that it was better than the longitudinal uterine incision in terms of chances for scar rupture and injury to vessels. Ferdinand Adolf Kehrer, another German gynecologist, was accredited with being the first gynecologist to use a horizontal incision to begin this operation. This new method of incision, in combination with methods of anesthesia and the invention of absorptive polymers, began the era of cesarean sections with higher success rates.
