= Franz Weitlaner =

Austrian physician

Franz Weitlaner (German: [ˈvaɪtlaːnɐ]; 1872–1944) was an Austrian physician who is known for designing the self-retaining retractor bearing his name.

== Life ==
Weitlaner was born in Welsberg which was at the time in the Austro-Hungarian Empire. His initial higher education was in theology, but at the age of 20 he began medical studies at the University of Innsbruck, where he completed his doctorate in 1898 and his clinical training in 1902. After a stint as a ship's surgeon, he married Leopoldine (née Kraubmann), and established a general practice in the remote village of Ottenthal. Lacking adequate surgical assistants there, he developed the retractor which bears his name, publishing an article on its genesis and design in 1905. Weitlaner departed Ottenthal in 1909 to take up similar positions in rural Austria.

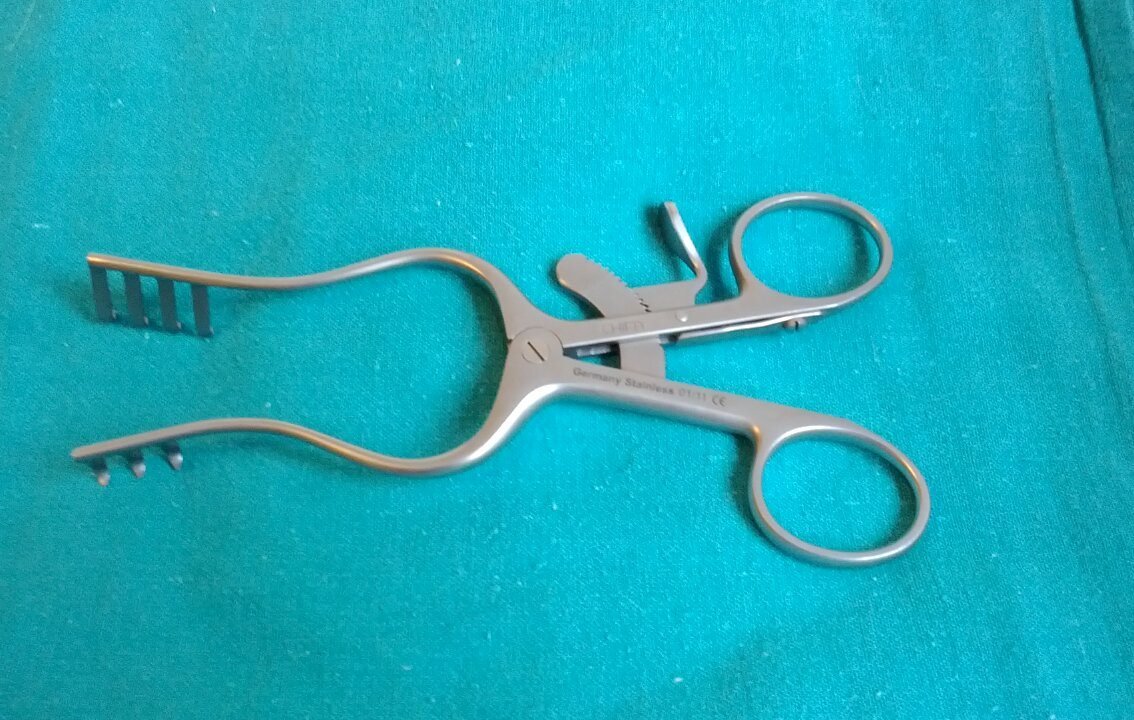
Weitlaner retractor
