= Maylard incision =

Incisions used for caesarean section, including the Maylard incision. Is: Supra-umbilical incision Im: Median incision IM: Maylard incision IP: Pfannenstiel incision

Maylard incision is a surgical incision in which a transverse cut is made on rectus abdominis muscle to allow wider access to the pelvic cavity. It is also called Mackenrodt incision. For gynaecological surgery, the skin incision is made 5–8 cm above the pubic symphysis. The site of skin incision is above and parallel to traditional Pfannenstiel incision. The rectus fascia and muscle are cut transversely and the incision is extended as far laterally as needed. The anterior rectus sheath is not separated from the muscle to facilitate easy closure at the end of the surgical procedure. The inferior epigastric vessels which span across more than half of the rectus muscle's width are identified and ligated. In patients with peripheral arterial disease, ligation of inferior epigastric vessels may lead to distal ischemia. Finally, the peritoneum is cut laterally.

After the surgery, peritoneum is closed with an absorbable suture. The ties placed on the inferior epigastric vessels are inspected to ensure hemostasis. The rectus fascia is closed with monofilament absorbable suture. The rectus muscle stumps do not require suturing. The skin and subcutaneous tissue are closed with subcuticular suture. The complications associated with Maylard incision are delayed bleeding from cut edges of rectus muscles and from deep epigastric vessels. In some patients, the incision may not offer sufficient exposure of upper abdomen. Maylard incision is likely to cause more pain than Pfannenstiel incision during the first post-operative week. However, Maylard incision has reduced rate of incisional hernia and more cosmetic appeal.
