= Hermann Johannes Pfannenstiel =

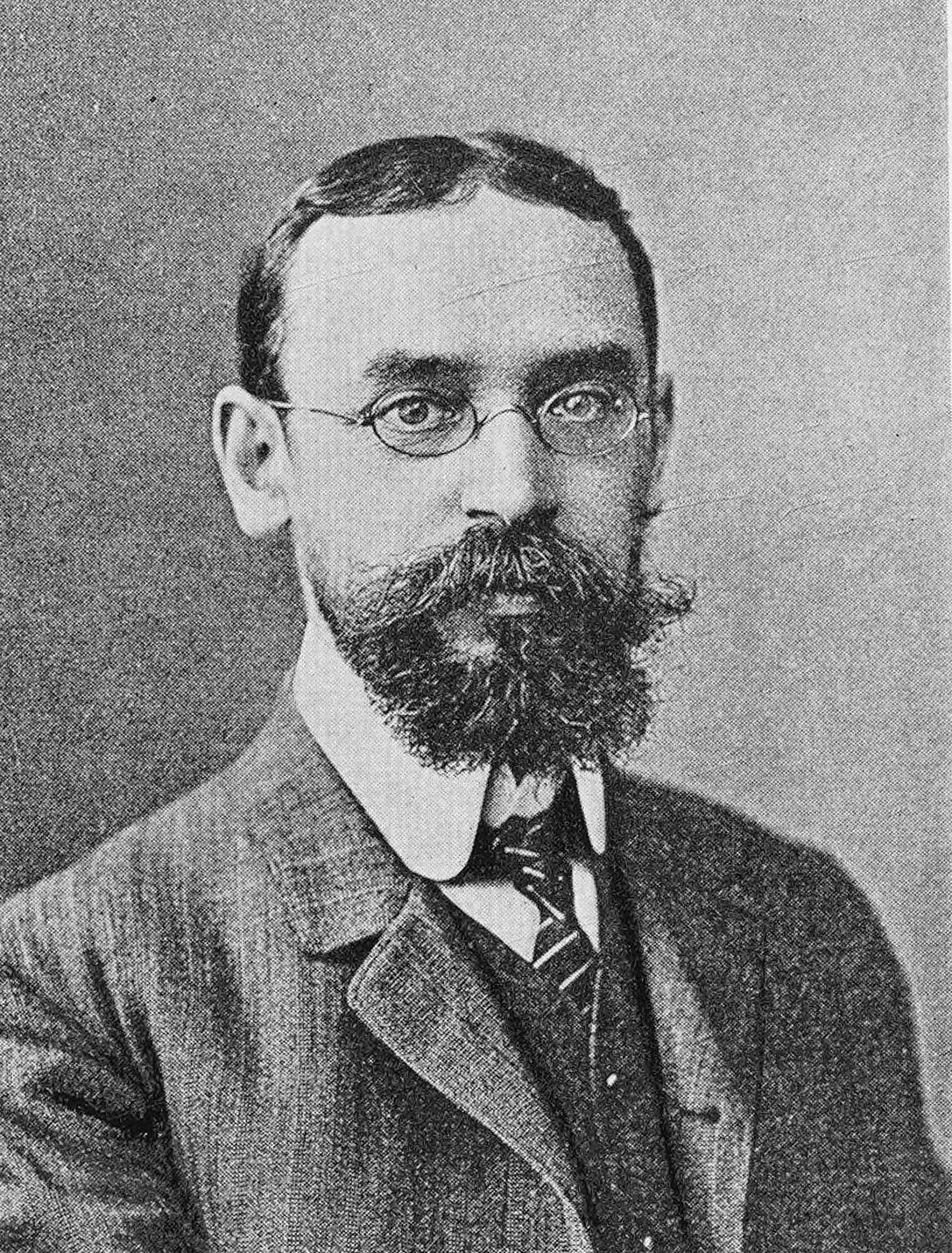
- Born: June 28, 1862
- Died: July 3, 1909 (aged 47)
- Education: Humboldt University of Berlin
- Occupation: Gynecologist
- Known for: Pfannenstiel incision
- Spouse: Elisabeth Behlendorff
- Children: Wilhelm Pfannenstiel

Hermann Johannes Pfannenstiel (28 June 1862 – 3 July 1909) was a German gynecologist born in Berlin.

In 1885 he received his doctorate in Berlin and afterwards worked as a hospital assistant in Posen. He later moved to Breslau, where in 1896 he became an associate professor. In 1902 he was appointed chair of the department of obstetrics and gynecology at the University of Giessen, and five years later, he attained a similar position at the University of Kiel.

From 1891 he was secretary of the German Society for Gynaecology (Deutsche Gesellschaft für Gynäkologie). Beginning in 1896, he was co-editor of the journal Archiv für Gynäkologie (Archives of Gynaecology).

Among his better known publications were works on ovarian pathology, uterine tumors and the formation of carcinomas following ovariotomy. In 1908 he was the first physician to give a comprehensive description of familial icterus gravis neonatorum.

Pfannenstiel is best remembered for the eponymous Pfannenstiel incision, a transverse incision used in genitourinary surgery that is still widely used today. He published his paper in 1900 when he described 51 cases. His intent was to decrease the risk of an incisional hernia; results also proved to be cosmetically better.

On 3 July 1909 at the age of 47, Pfannenstiel died from sepsis after having injured his finger during surgery for a tubo-ovarian abscess. He was the father of Wilhelm Pfannenstiel. Pfannenstiel married Elisabeth Behlendorff in 1889.
