= Rib spreader =

Surgical instrument for separating ribs during thoracic surgery

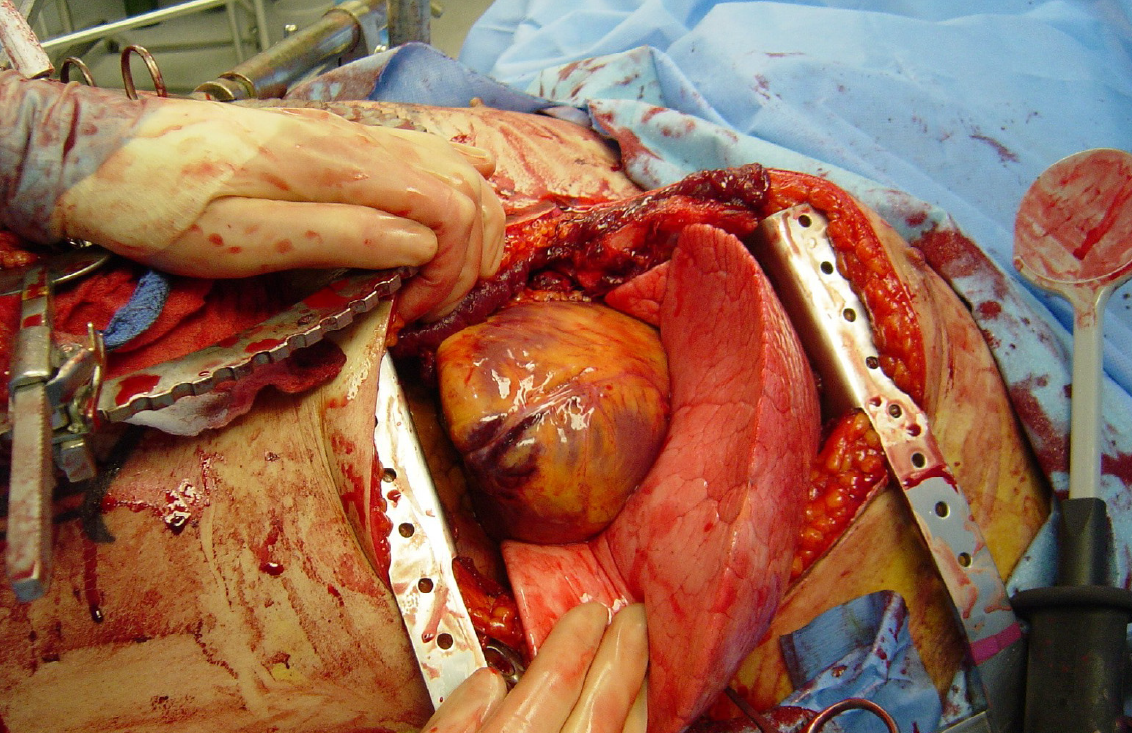
A Finochietto retractor used in an emergency thoracotomy

A rib spreader, also known as Finochietto retractor, is a type of retractor specifically designed to separate ribs in thoracic surgery (see picture in external link ). Rack-and-pinion-type stainless steel rib spreaders (with a thumb-screw to lock it in place) were an innovation introduced by French surgeon Theodore Truffier in 1914. This was modified in 1936 by Argentine surgeon Enrique Finochietto to have fenestrated blades (blades with "windows") and a hand-cranked lever to both separate the arms in a staged fashion and lock them in place at each stop. The Burford–Finochietto rib spreader has replaceable blades. The Tuffier and especially the Burford–Finochietto (and its variants) are ubiquitous in open thoracic surgery. Recently, a new intelligent, automated rib spreader in development demonstrated results superior to the Finochietto-style retractors.

== See also ==
- Instruments used in general surgery
