= Enrique Finochietto =

Argentine academic, physician and inventor (1881–1948)

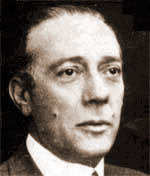
Dr. Enrique Finochietto

Enrique Finochietto (March 13, 1881 – February 17, 1948) was an Argentine academic, physician and inventor.

== Life and work ==
Enrique Finochietto was born in 1881 in Buenos Aires to Ana and Tomás Finochietto. His father died during his early childhood, and he was raised mostly by his mother. He excelled in industrial design while in secondary school, and enrolled at the University of Buenos Aires in 1897.

Finochietto interned at the university's Clinical Hospital, becoming an assistant to a surgeon, Dr. Alejandro Posadas. His thesis, El Pie-Bot Varus-Equino-Congénito, earned him a medical degree with honors, in 1904. He entered the Clinic of Skin and Venereal Diseases, a dependency of Buenos Aires' important Rawson Hospital, as a surgical intern.

Finochietto studied nose and throat, gynecological and orthopedic surgical practices in western European hospitals from 1906 to 1909 and, on his return, he was appointed chief of a surgical division at Rawson Hospital – where he lived in order to be on hand for emergencies. He returned to Europe in 1918, working during World War I in the Argentine Hospital for the Wounded in Passy, near Paris. For these efforts, he received the Legion of Honor and the Red Cross Medal, in 1919. Finochietto then traveled to the United States to observe surgical practices at the Mayo Clinic and other hospitals, before returning to Argentina.

The surgeon returned to Buenos Aires, where he was named the chief of the surgical division at Rawson Hospital, then undergoing an extensive enlargement and modernization. Finochietto planned the new surgical pavilion (Pavilion IX), where he worked alongside his brothers, Drs. Miguel Ángel and Ricardo Finochietto. Pavilion IX included innovations of his design such as an outpatient department with separate dressing and examining rooms, separate sterile dressing packages, a narrower stretcher (that could maneuver through the halls more easily), separate departments of orthopedic surgery, endoscopy and pathology (among others), and laboratories and radiology departments in the hospital itself. He also eliminated the unwieldy book form of medical records that had existed previously, and instead created separate envelopes for patients.

Dr. Finochietto not only changed the way surgical pavilions were organized and operated, he also invented many surgical instruments, having sixty-seven inventions to his credit. These included an electric surgical table which allowed a patient to be moved to any position, a special orthopedic table, a thoracic rib spreader (1936), the surgical vacuum, the "Finochietto scissors," and a bench that allowed surgeons to operate while seated. Establishing the Surgical Graduate School of Buenos Aires, he also changed how surgery was taught and performed in Argentina. Finochietto insisted on giving students more practical experience in surgery and included instruction on proper, professional demeanor throughout a surgical procedure.

He taught as a Clinical Professor of Surgery at the University of Buenos Aires, and became the president of the Buenos Aires Surgical Society in 1922. He developed new surgical techniques in 1924 for the treatment of the stomach, duodenum, and small intestine. Dr. Finochietto in 1929 performed the first intervention on a cardiac lesion in Argentina, successfully repairing a bullet wound to the heart of a minor.

Dr. Finochietto was also a fan of the Tango, and he counted crooner Carlos Gardel among his friends. Composer Julio de Caro, composed Buen amigo (Good Friend) in his honor, in 1925. An academic, he published over 100 peer-reviewed papers and began work on a sixteen-volume surgical guide with his brother, Ricardo. Finochietto, who had contracted syphilis during his travels abroad, suffered from worsening health, and he accepted retirement from the university in 1933 as professor emeritus. The ailing surgeon extracted a hydatid cyst from a child in 1940 - his last surgical intervention. His condition forced him to abandon his practice and he continued writing until his death on February 17, 1948, at age 66.

== Bibliography ==
- Losardo RJ et al. Alfonso Roque Albanese: Latin American Pioneer of Heart Surgery. Tribute from the Pan American Association of Anatomy. Int. J. Morphol.. 2017;35(3):1016-1025. ISSN 0717-9502
