= Pfannenstiel incision =

Surgical incision of the abdomen

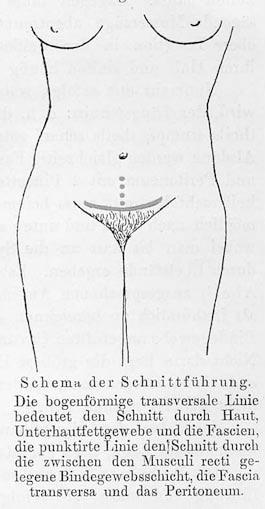
- First description of Pfannenstiel's incision.
- Specialty: Ob/gyn/ surgery
- [edit on Wikidata]

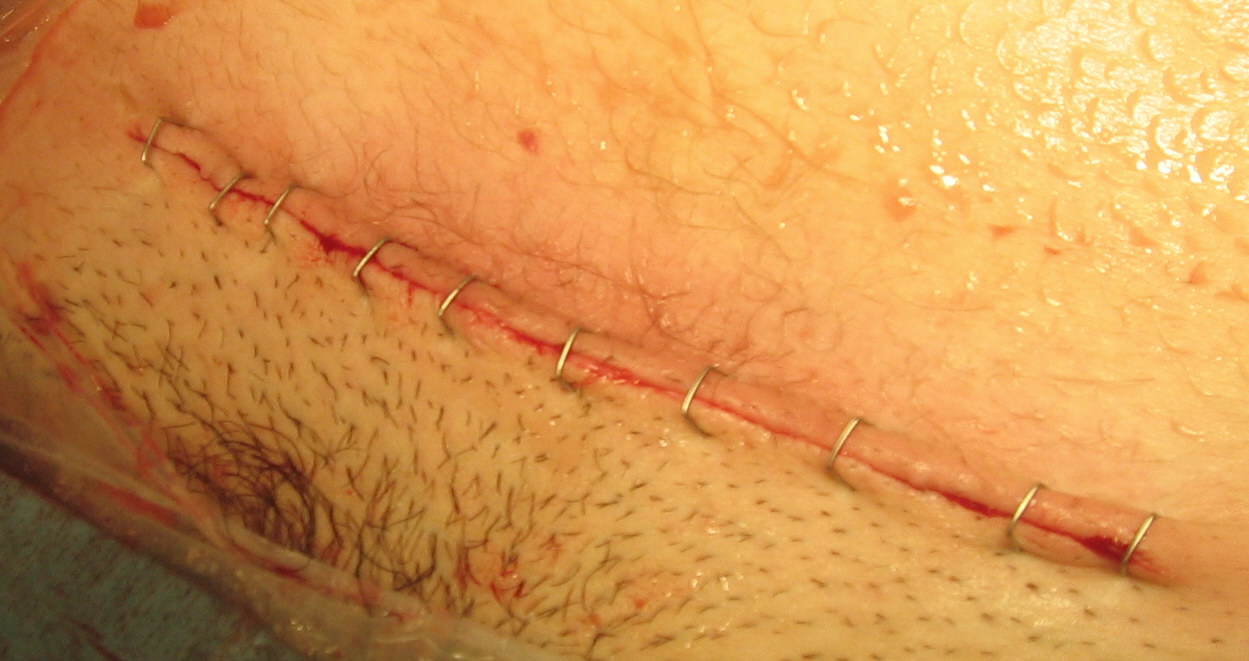
A Pfannenstiel incision for a caesarian section closed with surgical staples. The superior aspect of mons pubis and pubic hair are seen at bottom of the image.

A Pfannenstiel incision /ˈfɑːnɪnʃtiːl/, Kerr incision, Pfannenstiel-Kerr incision or pubic incision is a type of abdominal surgical incision that allows access to the abdomen. It is used for gynecologic and orthopedics surgeries, and it is the most common method for performing Caesarian sections today. This incision is also used in Stoppa approach for orthopedics surgeries to treat pelvic fractures.

The Pfannenstiel incision offers a large view of the central pelvis but limits exposure to the lateral pelvis and upper abdomen, factors that limit the usefulness of this incision for gynecologic cancer surgery.

This incision is commonly called the "bikini line incision". Some common reasons for this surgical access are obstetric delivery and hernia repair. It is often used in preference to other incision types for the sake of aesthetics, because the scar will be hidden by the pubic hair. The incision does not distort the belly button and heals faster than the traditional vertical incision.

The surgeon cuts on a generally horizontal (slightly curved) line just above the pubic symphysis. The skin and subcutaneous fat are lifted off the rectus muscle fascia, going towards the head. This allows access to the lower midline of the anterior abdominal wall fascia. The fascia was cut vertically to separate the rectus muscles and enter the abdomen. Though the skin is incised transversely, the fascia was initially made in the midline but the modern technique involves transection of the fascia laterally.

== Etymology and history ==
The name derives from the surname of Hermann Johannes Pfannenstiel (1862–1909), the German gynecologist who invented the technique in 1900.

In the United Kingdom, the incision was popularized by Monroe Kerr, who first used it in 1911, so in English-speaking countries it is sometimes called the Kerr incision or the Pfannenstiel–Kerr incision. Kerr published the results in 1920, proposing that this method would cause less damage to the vascularized areas of the uterus than the classical operation. He claimed that it was better than the longitudinal uterine incision in terms of chances for scar rupture and injury to vessels.

== See also ==
- Lower segment Caesarean section
