= Management of obesity =

Methods of body fat reduction

Share of adults who are overweight

Management of obesity can include lifestyle changes, medications, or surgery. Although many studies have sought effective interventions, there is currently no evidence-based, well-defined, and efficient intervention to prevent obesity.

Treatment for obesity often consists of weight loss via healthy nutrition and increasing physical exercise. A 2007 review concluded that certain subgroups, such as those with type 2 diabetes and women who undergo weight loss, show long-term benefits in all-cause mortality, while long‐term outcomes for men are "not clear and need further investigation."

The most effective treatment for obesity is bariatric surgery. Surgery for severe obesity is associated with long-term weight loss and decreased overall mortality. One study found a weight loss of between 14% and 25% (depending on the type of procedure performed) at 10 years, and a 29% reduction in all cause mortality when compared to standard weight loss measures. Another study also found reduced mortality in those who underwent bariatric surgery for severe obesity.

Diet programs can produce short-term weight loss and, to a lesser extent, over the long-term. Greater weight loss results, including amongst underserved populations, are achieved when proper nutrition is regularly combined with physical exercise and counseling. Dietary and lifestyle changes are effective in limiting excessive weight gain in pregnancy and improve outcomes for both the mother and the child.

Various medications are approved for treating obesity with varying rates of weight loss between 3-21%, but weight regain is very common after discontinuation. Medications are recommended to be used only in combination with lifestyle changes. After stopping treatment with GLP-1 agonists such as semaglutide, liraglutide and tirzepatide, people regain on average more than half (50–70%) of the lost weight within 1 year.

== Dieting ==
Treatment selection based on BMI
Treatment	25-26.9	27-29.9	30-34.9	35-39.9	≥40
Lifestyle intervention (diet, physical activity, behavior)	Yes	Yes	Yes	Yes	Yes
Pharmacotherapy	Not appropriate	With co-morbidities	Yes	Yes	Yes
Surgery	Not appropriate	Not appropriate	With co-morbidities	Yes	Yes

Diets to promote weight loss can be divided into four categories: low-fat, low-carbohydrate, low-calorie, and very low calorie. Many dietary patterns are effective. A meta-analysis of six randomized controlled trials found no difference between three of the main diet types (low calorie, low carbohydrate and low fat), with a 2–4 kilograms (4.4–8.8 lb) weight loss in all studies. At two years these three methods resulted in similar weight loss irrespective of the macronutrients emphasized. High protein diets do not appear to make any difference. A diet high in added sugars such as those in soft drinks increases weight. There is evidence that dieting alone can be effective for weight loss and improving health for obese individuals. However, a large study of adults found that obesity was associated with differences in brain structure, largely due to shared genetic factors, suggesting that interventions for obesity should not focus solely on energy content, but also take into account the neurobehavioral profile that obesity is genetically associated with.

Dieting for calorie restriction is advised for overweight individuals by the Dietary Guidelines for Americans and United Kingdom's NICE.

== Exercise ==
With use, muscles consume energy derived from both fat and glycogen. Due to the large size of leg muscles, walking, running and cycling are the most effective means of exercise to reduce body fat. Exercise affects macronutrient balance. During moderate exercise, equivalent to a brisk walk, there is a shift to greater use of fat as a fuel. To maintain health, the American Heart Association recommends a minimum of 30 minutes of moderate exercise at least 5 days a week.

The Cochrane Collaboration found that exercising alone led to limited weight loss. In combination with diet, however, it resulted in a 1 kilogram weight loss over dieting alone. A 1.5 kilograms (3.3 pounds) loss was observed with a greater degree of exercise. Even though exercise as carried out in the general population has only modest effects, a dose response curve is found and very intense exercise can lead to substantial weight loss. During 20 weeks of basic military training with no dietary restriction, obese military recruits lost 12.5 kg (28 lb). High levels of physical activity seem to be necessary to maintain weight loss. A pedometer appears useful for motivation. Over an average of 18-weeks of use, physical activity increased by 27% resulting in a 0.38 decrease in BMI.

Signs that encourage the use of stairs as well as community campaigns have been shown to be effective in increasing exercise in a population. The city of Bogotá, Colombia, for example, blocks off 113 kilometers (70 mi) of roads every Sunday and on holidays to make it easier for its citizens to get exercise. These pedestrian zones are part of an effort to combat chronic diseases, including obesity.

In an effort to combat the issue, a primary school in Australia instituted a standing classroom in 2013.

There is evidence that exercise alone is not sufficient to produce meaningful weight loss, but combining dieting and exercise provide the greatest health benefits and weight loss on the long term.

== Weight loss programs ==
Weight loss programs involve lifestyle changes including diet modifications, physical activity and behavior therapy. This may involve eating smaller meals, cutting down on certain types of food and making a conscious effort to exercise more. These programs also enable people to connect with a group of others who are attempting to lose weight, in the hopes that participants will form mutually motivating and encouraging relationships. It is recommended that to have a weight loss benefit weight loss programs should be intensive; with at least 12 sessions over six months. It is also recommended that all adults who are overweight or obese should be offered these programs. These programs may be taught in group settings, individually or via Telehealth. Medications for obesity may be combined with weight loss programs. Weight loss programs cause a 1-9% weight loss at 12–24 months with other estimates of higher intensity programs showing a weight loss of 5-10% at 6–12 months.

A number of popular programs exist including Weight Watchers, Overeaters Anonymous and Jenny Craig. These appear to provide modest weight loss (2.9 kg; 6.4 lb) over dieting on one's own (0.2 kg; 0.44 lb) over a two-year period, similarly to non-commercial diets. As of 2005, there was insufficient scientific evidence to determine whether Internet-based programs produce effective weight loss. The Chinese government has introduced a number of "fat farms" where obese children go for reinforced exercise and has passed a law which requires students to exercise or play sports for an hour a day at school (see Obesity in China).

In a structured setting with a trained therapist, these interventions produce an average weight loss of up to 8 kg in 6 months to 1 year, and 67% of people who lost greater than 10% of their body mass maintained or continued to lose weight one year later. There is a gradual weight regain after the first year of about 1 to 2 kg per year, but on the long-term this still results in weight loss. Risk factors for cardiovascular disease and for diabetes are reduced for several years after taking part in a weight management programme, even if people regained weight.

Attending group meetings for weight reduction programmes rather than receiving one-on-one support may increase the likelihood that obese people will lose weight. Those who participated in groups had more treatment time and were more likely to lose enough weight to improve their health. Study authors suggested that one explanation for the difference is that group participants spent more time with the clinician (or whoever delivered the programme) than those receiving one-on-one support.

Comprehensive diet programs, providing counseling, targets for calorie intake and exercise, may be more efficient than dieting without guidance ("self-help"), although the evidence is very limited. Following comprehensive lifestyle modifications, the average maintained weight loss is more than 3 kg (6.6 lb) or 3% of total body mass, and could be sustained for five years, and up to 20% of the individuals maintain a weight loss of at least 10% (average of 33 kg). There is some evidence that fast weight loss produce greater long-term weight loss than gradual weight loss. Moderate on-site comprehensive lifestyle changes produce a greater weight loss than usual care, of 2 to 4 kg on average in 6 to 12 months. High-intensity comprehensive programs usually yield more weight loss than moderate or low-intensity, with about 35% to 60% of overweight individuals maintaining more than 5 kg weight loss after 2 years.

The NICE devised a set of essential criteria to be met by commercial weight management organizations to be approved.

The Transtheoretical Model (TTM) has been used as a framework to assist the design of lifestyle modification programmes, including weight management. A systematic review found that there is insufficient evidence to draw conclusions regarding the effects of TTM-based programs targeting weight loss that included dietary or physical activity interventions, or both (and also combined with other interventions), on sustainable weight loss (one year or longer) in overweight and obese adults. However, very low quality evidence points that this approach may induce positive changes in physical activity and dietary habits, such as increased in exercise duration and frequency, improvement in fruits and vegetables consumption, and reduced dietary fat intake.

== Medication ==
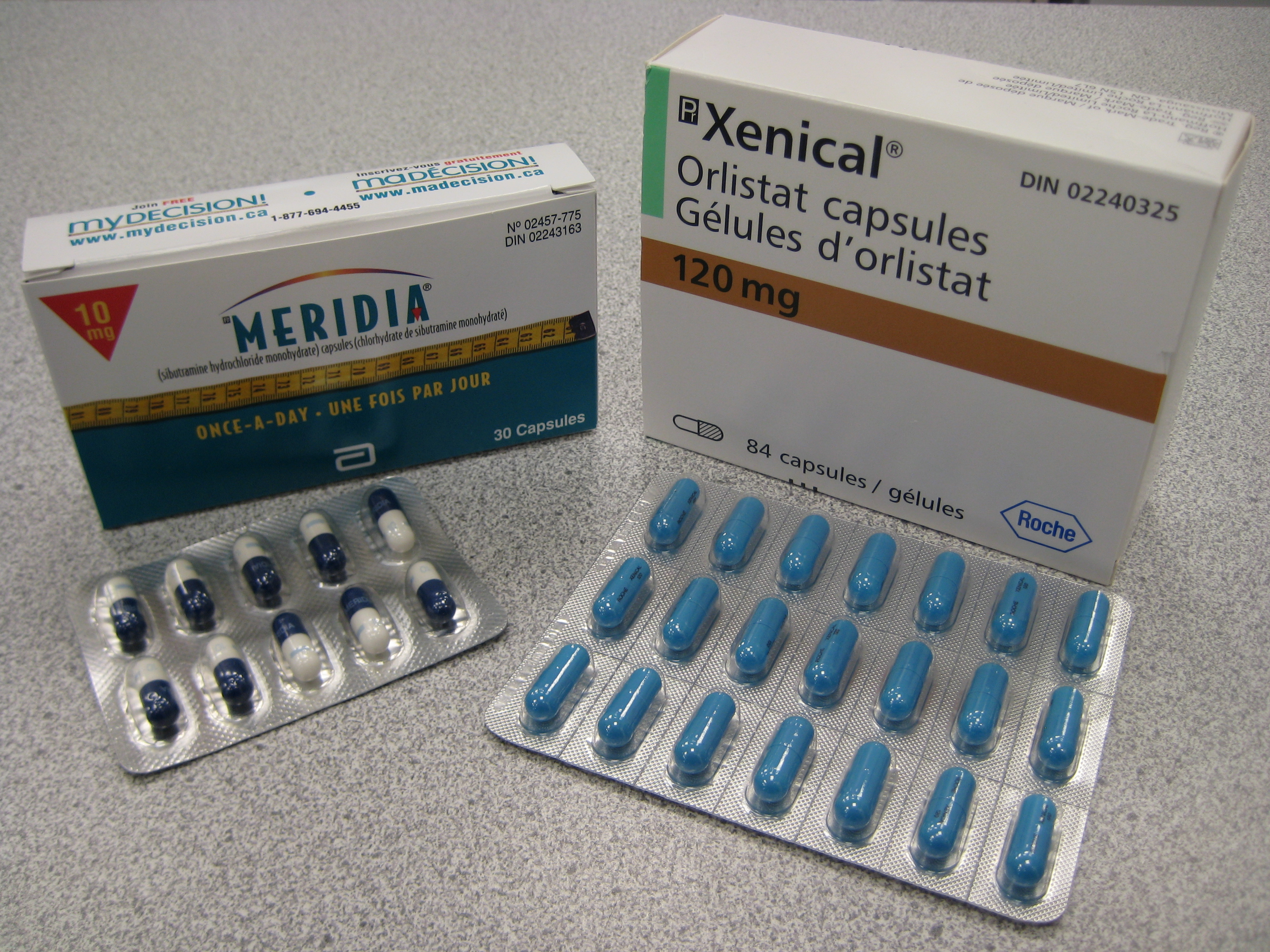
Orlistat (Xenical), the most commonly used medication to treat obesity and sibutramine (Meridia), a withdrawn medication due to cardiovascular side effects

=== Anti-obesity medications currently approved by the FDA for weight loss ===
Several anti-obesity medications are currently approved by the FDA for long term use.

- Liraglutide, a GLP-1 receptor agonist taken by subcutaneous injection once daily.
- Naltrexone/bupropion, a combination of naltrexone and bupropion taken by mouth twice daily.
- Orlistat is a lipase inhibitor taken by mouth three times daily with each main meal containing fat. Orlistat reduces intestinal fat absorption by inhibiting pancreatic lipase. Over the longer term, average weight loss on orlistat is 2.9 kg (6.4 lb). It leads to a reduced incidence of diabetes, and has some effect on cholesterol. However, there is little information on how it affects the longer-term complications or outcomes of obesity. It also inhibits absorption of fat soluble vitamins; vitamins A, D, E and K, so supplementation is needed for those on orlistat.
- Phentermine/topiramate combination of phentermine and topiramate taken by mouth once daily.
- Semaglutide, a GLP-1 receptor agonist taken by subcutaneous injection once weekly.
- Tirzepatide is a gastric inhibitory polypeptide (GIP) analog and a GLP-1 receptor agonist taken by subcutaneous injection once weekly. As of 2023, tirzepatide has shown the greatest weight reduction of medications.
- Phendimetrazine, diethylpropion, and phentermine are approved by the FDA for short term use, up to 12 weeks at a time.

=== Other medications ===
- Bupropion, topiramate, metformin, zonisamide, and amphetamine are sometimes used off-label for weight loss.
- The usefulness of certain drugs depends upon the comorbidities present. Metformin is preferred in overweight diabetics and for those gaining weight, as it may lead to mild weight loss in comparison to sulfonylureas or insulin. The thiazolidinediones, on the other hand, may cause weight gain, but decrease central obesity. Diabetics also achieve modest weight loss with fluoxetine and orlistat over 12–57 weeks.
- Sibutramine (Meridia), which acts in the brain to inhibit deactivation of the neurotransmitters, thereby decreasing appetite was withdrawn from the UK market in January 2010 and United States and Canadian markets in October 2010 due to cardiovascular concerns. In 2010 it was found that sibutramine increases the risk of heart attacks and strokes in people with a history of cardiovascular disease.
- Recombinant human leptin is very effective in those with obesity due to congenital complete leptin deficiency via decreasing energy intake and possibly increases energy expenditure. This condition is, however, rare and this treatment is not effective for inducing weight loss in the majority of people with obesity. It is being investigated to determine whether or not it helps with weight loss maintenance.
- Though hypothesized that supplementation of vitamin D may be an effective treatment for obesity, studies do not support this. There is also no strong evidence to recommend herbal medicines for weight loss.

== Surgery ==
Bariatric surgery ("weight loss surgery") is the use of surgical intervention in the treatment of obesity. As every operation may have complications, surgery is only recommended for severely obese people (BMI > 40) who have failed to lose weight following dietary modification and pharmacological treatment. Weight loss surgery relies on various principles: the two most common approaches are reducing the volume of the stomach (e.g. by adjustable gastric banding and vertical banded gastroplasty), which produces an earlier sense of satiation, and reducing the length of bowel that comes into contact with food (e.g. by gastric bypass surgery or endoscopic duodenal-jejunal bypass surgery), which directly reduces absorption. Band surgery is reversible, while bowel shortening operations are not. Some procedures can be performed laparoscopically. Complications from weight loss surgery are frequent.

Surgery for severe obesity is associated with long-term weight loss and decreased overall mortality. One study found a weight loss of between 14% and 25% (depending on the type of procedure performed) at 10 years, and a 29% reduction in all cause mortality when compared to standard weight loss measures. A marked decrease in the risk of diabetes mellitus, cardiovascular disease and cancer has also been found after bariatric surgery. Marked weight loss occurs during the first few months after surgery, and the loss is sustained in the long term. Bariatric surgery, particularly Roux-en-Y gastric bypass and sleeve gastrectomy, have demonstrated effectiveness in promoting weight loss and improving diabetes outcomes among severely obese individuals. A 2021 Evidence Update for Clinicians found that Roux-en-Y gastric bypass patients experienced slightly better weight loss and diabetes control outcomes than sleeve gastrectomy patients, though with a higher risk for rehospitalization and need for additional surgeries.

In one study there was an unexplained increase in deaths from accidents and suicide, but this did not outweigh the benefit in terms of disease prevention. When the two main techniques are compared, gastric bypass procedures are found to lead to 30% more weight loss than banding procedures one year after surgery. For obese individuals with non-alcoholic fatty liver disease (NAFLD), bariatric surgery improves or cures the liver.

A preoperative diet such as low-calorie diets or very-low-calorie diet, is usually recommended to reduce liver volume by 16-20%, and preoperative weight loss is the only factor associated with postoperative weight loss. Preoperative weight loss can reduce operative time and hospital stay. although there is insufficient evidence whether preoperative weight loss may be beneficial to reduce long-term morbidity or complications. Weight loss and decreases in liver size may be independent from the amount of calorie restriction.

Ileojejunal bypass, in which the digestive tract is rerouted to bypass the small intestine, was an experimental surgery designed as a remedy for morbid obesity.

The effects of liposuction on obesity are less well determined. Some small studies show benefits while others show none. A treatment involving the placement of an intragastric balloon via gastroscopy has shown promise. One type of balloon led to a weight loss of 5.7 BMI units over 6 months or 14.7 kg (32 lb). Regaining lost weight is common after removal, however, and 4.2% of people were intolerant of the device.

An implantable nerve simulator which improves the feeling of fullness was approved by the FDA in 2015.

In 2016 the FDA approved an aspiration therapy device that siphons food from the stomach to the outside and decreases caloric intake. As of 2015 one trial shows promising results.

== Health policy ==
Obesity is a complex public health and policy problem because of its prevalence, costs, and health effects. As such, managing it requires changes in the wider societal context and effort by communities, local authorities, and governments. Public health efforts seek to understand and correct the environmental factors responsible for the increasing prevalence of obesity in the population. Solutions look at changing the factors that cause excess food energy consumption and inhibit physical activity. Efforts include federally reimbursed meal programs in schools, limiting direct junk food marketing to children, and decreasing access to sugar-sweetened beverages in schools. The World Health Organization recommends the taxing of sugary drinks. When constructing urban environments, efforts have been made to increase access to parks and to develop pedestrian routes.

Mass media campaigns seem to have limited effectiveness in changing behaviors that influence obesity. At the same time they can increase knowledge and awareness regarding physical activity and diet, which might lead to changes in the long term. Campaigns might also be able to reduce the amount of time spent sitting or lying down and positively affect the intention to be active physically. Nutritional labelling with energy information on menus might be able to help reducing energy intake while dining in restaurants.

Since there is a relationship between obesity and automobile travel, interventions relating to transportation infrastructure (for example, policy aimed at encouraging the use of public transportation) could potentially reduce obesity.

== Clinical protocols ==
Much of the Western world has created clinical practice guidelines in an attempt to address rising rates of obesity. Australia, Canada, the European Union, the United Kingdom, and the United States have all published statements since 2004.

In a clinical practice guideline by the American College of Physicians, the following five recommendations are made:

1. People with a BMI of over 30 should be counseled on diet, exercise and other relevant behavioral interventions, and set a realistic goal for weight loss.
2. If these goals are not achieved, pharmacotherapy can be offered. The person needs to be informed of the possibility of side-effects and the unavailability of long-term safety and efficacy data.
3. Drug therapy may consist of sibutramine, orlistat, phentermine, diethylpropion, fluoxetine, and bupropion. Evidence is not sufficient to recommend sertraline, topiramate, or zonisamide.
4. In people with a BMI over 40 who fail to achieve their weight loss goals (with or without medication) and who develop obesity-related complications, referral for bariatric surgery may be indicated. The person needs to be aware of the potential complications.
5. Those requiring bariatric surgery should be referred to high-volume referral centers, as the evidence suggests that surgeons who frequently perform these procedures have fewer complications.

A clinical practice guideline by the US Preventive Services Task Force (USPSTF) concluded that the evidence is insufficient to recommend for or against routine behavioral counseling to promote a healthy diet in unselected people in primary care settings, but that intensive behavioral dietary counseling is recommended in those with hyperlipidemia and other known risk factors for cardiovascular and diet-related chronic disease. Intensive counseling can be delivered by primary care clinicians or by referral to other specialists, such as nutritionists or dietitians. A survey of primary care physicians in the United States found that although clinical guidelines do not consider overweight to be a risk factor that increases mortality, physicians often report believing that being overweight increases all-cause mortality.

Canada developed and published evidence-based practice guidelines in 2006. The guidelines attempt to address the prevention and management of obesity at both the individual and population levels in both children and adults. The European Union published clinical practice guidelines in 2008 in an effort to address the rising rates of obesity in Europe. Australia came out with practice guidelines in 2004.
