= Edward E. Mason =

American surgeon and research scientist

Edward Eaton Mason
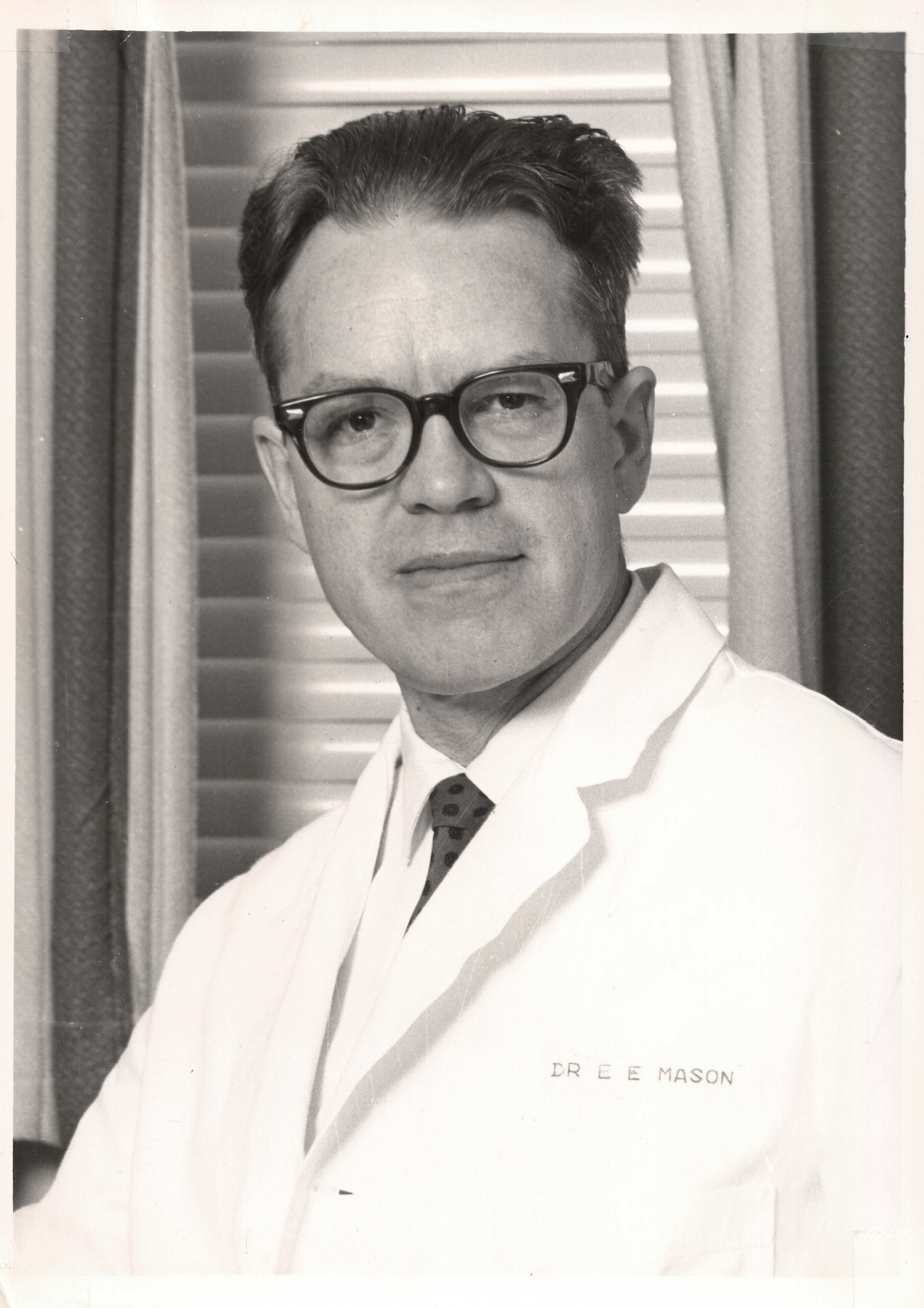
- Mason in 1964
- Born: October 16, 1920; Boise, Idaho, US
- Died: December 29, 2020 (aged 100); Iowa City, Iowa, US
- Education: University of Iowa BA, MD; University of Minnesota, PhD
- Known for: Obesity surgery
- Spouse: Dordana Fairman Mason
- Medical career
- Profession: Surgeon, researcher
- Institutions: University of Iowa
- Research: Bariatric and metabolic surgery
- Notable works: Computer Applications in Medicine
- Awards: Distinguished Alumni Award University of Iowa Carver College of Medicine—2003; Distinguished Alumni Award University of Minnesota Medical School—2003; The ASMBS Foundation Outstanding Achievement Award—2005; Medallion for the Advancement of Surgical Care American Surgical Association—2013

Edward Eaton Mason (October 16, 1920 – December 29, 2020) was an American surgeon, professor, and medical researcher who specialized in obesity surgery. He is known for developing restrictive gastric surgery for morbidly obese patients. Mason introduced the first gastric bypass surgery in 1966 and was the inventor of the first vertical banded gastroplasty surgery in 1980.

He was the founder of the American Society for Metabolic and Bariatric Surgery (ASMBS) and was its first president. Mason also founded the International Bariatric Surgery Registry and served as its director. In addition, he was the author of more than 200 research papers and book chapters and has published five books, including Computer Applications in Medicine and A Fat Chance.

== Early life and education ==
Mason was an only child born in a taxi cab on October 16, 1920, while his mother was on her way to the hospital in Boise, Idaho. His mother, Dora Eaton Mason, was a teacher and sculptor, the creator of the original Nile Kinnick bust. His father, Edward Files Mason, was a professor of journalism at the University of Idaho and the University of Iowa. During the Great Depression, Mason and his parents moved from Idaho to Iowa City in 1929.

Mason became interested in premedical studies in grade school. Following his graduation from Iowa City's City High School in 1939, he went to the University of Iowa and entered the US Navy. Classes went year-round to speed the students through undergraduate and medical school to provide the US Navy with officers during WWII. Mason received a BA in 1943 and an MD in 1945 from the University of Iowa, and the war ended only months later. During his time at the institute, he met and married Dordana Fairman in 1944, who was studying for her master's degree in dietetics.

After graduation from medical school in 1945, Mason did a straight surgical internship in general surgery at the University of Minnesota.

Between 1947 and 1949, he worked under the US Navy at Wadsworth Veterans Hospital in Leavenworth, Kansas. He wrote his first paper on treating intestinal tuberculosis with streptomycin, published in January 1949. The research paper reviewed the 33 patients he had observed at the Wadsworth Veterans Hospital and other Veterans Administrated (VA) hospitals in the country. Streptomycin was the first antibiotic effective in treating TB.

In 1949, Mason returned to Minneapolis, Minnesota, for a surgical residency organized by Owen Harding Wangensteen (OHW) and stayed until 1953. OHW had written papers about animal studies for determining the best stomach operation for treating peptic ulcer disease, and Mason wanted to study this subject. At the end of his training, he assisted Wangensteen in repairing a giant abdominal hernia. Many of the giant hernia repair incisions would break down if the patients did not lose weight.

== Career ==
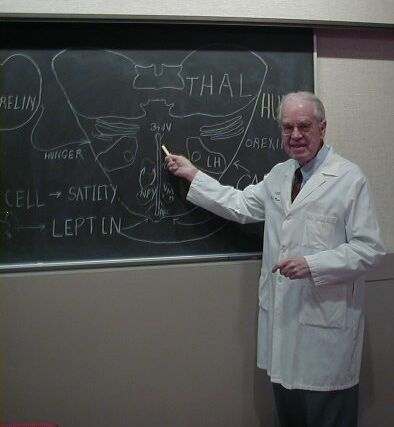
Edward E. Mason teaching at the University of Iowa

University of Iowa

After obtaining his PhD in surgery from the University of Minnesota in 1953, he returned to Iowa City to work in academic surgery as a professor at the University of Iowa Hospitals. Mason started using progressive preoperative pneumoperitoneum (PPP) with his giant hernia patients or pumping air into the abdomen every few days. This would restore room in the abdomen for the hernia contents. In 1954, at the suggestion of Arnold Kremen, he performed an intestinal or jejunal-ileal bypass on two patients who were gaining weight and breaking apart the hernia repair. He was not pleased with the complications of the intestinal bypass and performed no more of these operations to treat obesity. His other research and clinical interests included peptic ulcer disease, gastric cancer, running an artificial kidney for patients with acute renal failure, operating upon the thyroid and parathyroid glands, performing splenorenal shunts for patients with cirrhosis of the liver and bleeding esophageal varices, computer technology, and teaching about fluid and electrolyte imbalance in surgical patients.

Chikashi Ito and Gastric bypass for obesity

In August 1965, Mason attended a meeting in Edmonton, Canada, where the world leaders presented papers on stomach physiology. During this 2-week conference, Mason mapped out experiments to determine whether it was possible to bypass most of the stomach instead of removing it as OHW and many other surgeons had done. He believed these experiments would treat peptic ulcer disease and that ulcers would not result from his gastric bypass surgery.

At the University of Iowa, Mason met with Chikashi Ito, a Japanese surgeon arriving from Sapporo, Japan, with his family in 1965. Ito would spend all of his time in the animal laboratory doing research and surgery. This made it possible for Mason to do research, take care of patients, and teach. They both proceeded with a project supported by a departmental trust fund for the College of Medicine.

After the animal experiments, Mason and Ito were satisfied that it would be safe to use gastric bypass in human patients to begin treating patients with duodenal ulcers. From their research studies, they realized that peptic ulcer disease was not helped by gastric bypass, but their obese patients lost weight. Mason said, "I'd take the undesirable effect of gastric resection, which was weight loss, and use it for a desirable effect, to treat obesity."

In 1966 Mason began using the gastric bypass operation on a few patients who were extremely or morbidly obese and some of whom had giant inoperable hernias. At the time, an intestinal bypass was in widespread use for the treatment of morbid obesity, and Mason was told by those other surgeons that the severely obese patients would not be able to tolerate an inability to eat all that they wanted.

His stomach operation created a small meal-sized pouch and bypassed the rest of the stomach, duodenum, and a short segment of the small bowel. Patients who had this surgery volunteered that they no longer needed to overeat. It was found that gastric bypass causes a marked decrease in the secretion of ghrelin, a hormone that normally causes a feeling of hunger. Ghrelin is normally secreted in the upper (fundus) part of the stomach, which is bypassed. In addition, it was later found that gastric bypass can treat diabetes type-2.

Several of the early gastric bypass patients had bilious emesis, and Dr. Ward Griffen and coworkers at the University of Kentucky changed the Mason loop gastric bypass to a Roux-en-Y gastric bypass in 1977.

Vertical Banded Gastroplasty (VBG)

Mason began to simplify the operation to avoid bypass of the stomach and duodenum and prevent other complications from occurring besides weight reduction. The endeavour led to the development of Vertical Banded Gastroplasty Surgery (VBG), which he later practically performed on humans in November 1980 at UIHC. The upper stomach is stapled to create a small pouch and restrict food intake, but not change the normal digestive process. This restrictive surgery was commonly performed in the 1980s. However, patients were arriving heavier and wanted more weight loss, which gastric bypass surgery provided better than VBG. The Roux-en-Y gastric bypass (RYBG), a modification of the original gastric bypass, was both a restrictive and malabsorptive surgery and became the preferred method. It reduced the size of the stomach and limited the number of nutrients the body absorbed by bypassing a portion of the small intestine, resulting in better long-term weight loss.

American Society for Metabolic and Bariatric Surgery (ASMBS) and American Bariatric Surgery Registry (ABSR)

Mason began post-graduate courses at the University of Iowa with more than 50 surgeons for the surgical treatment of obesity in 1973. These course meetings were incorporated in Iowa as the American Society for Bariatric Surgery in 1983, and Mason became its first president. Later, it evolved into the American Society for Metabolic and Bariatric Surgery (ASMBS) to further reflect the effectiveness of surgery for metabolic diseases, particularly type 2 diabetes.

In 1986, Mason started the American Bariatric Surgery Registry (ABSR) to help surgeons and patients learn more about specific obesity operations and the lifelong effects of their preferred procedure. The name of the registry was later changed to International Bariatric Surgery Registry as it received worldwide exposure. Over time, the Bariatric Ongoing Longitudinal Database (BOLD) was formed.

Laparoscopic Obesity Surgery

Operations performed with an open incision started being executed laparoscopically with small incisions in the 1990s. In 1994, Dr. Alan Wittgrove from San Diego, CA, reported the first laparoscopic RYGB (lapRYGB). The process was more comfortable for the patient, resulting in a faster recovery with minimal complications. On a trip to Taiwan in 2001, Dr. Mason observed Dr. Wei-Jei Lee performing a laparoscopic VBG that was completed safely in an hour. After his return from this journey, the laparoscopic approach began in Iowa.

Treating Type 2 Diabetes with glucose mimetics

Mason found the common denominator between gastric and intestinal bypass when treating type 2 diabetes in 1998. The exposure of the distal bowel to glucose or other stimulants such as glucose mimetics resulted in the secretion of GLP-1 (glucagon-like peptide-1) hormones, which could potentially treat diabetes type-2 disease. Gastric bypass surgery treated type-2 diabetes through weight loss and the release of GLP-1 hormones.

To treat diabetes-type 2 patients without surgery, he thought that using a form of glucose substitute or glucose mimetic that would reach the distal ileum before it was absorbed could be a simple and cost-effective treatment. He suggested using glucose mimetic d-tagatose in addition to weight reduction with a proper diet and increased physical activity.

== Obesity surgery controversy ==
Initially, the insurance companies did not consider obesity a disease and would not pay for the obesity surgery. However, according to Mason, extreme obesity was and will be one of the biggest problems to solve. It can result in several chronic medical conditions, including heart disease, hypertension, stroke, diabetes, arthritis, gall bladder disease, sleep apnea, cancer, and others. Psychosocial and socio-economic impairment also occurs with morbid obesity. Eventually, in many states, the Center for Medicare and Medicaid Services began to pay for bariatric surgeries to treat obesity. Though, determining the appropriate patients for surgery by categorizing the criticality of obesity was mandatory. Morbidly obese patients were defined as having a Body Mass Index (BMI) exceeding 40. Less severely obese persons with a BMI of 35-40 could be considered for surgery if they had high-risk comorbidities such as type 2 diabetes or heart disease.

The crucial aspect of Mason's research was to deal with the complications followed by weight loss surgeries. He treated some of these patients with severe protein malnutrition from intestinal or jejunal-ileal bypass, with central venous feedings containing amino acids, glucose, and the required vitamins and minerals. He performed a surgical reversal of the intestinal bypass back to normal anatomy when necessary. At times he did concomitant conversions to stomach restriction operations.

== Publications ==
He published over 200 research papers and book chapters and was the author of five books, including Computer Applications in Medicine, his first book, published in 1964, and A Fat Chance, his final book, published on his 100th birthday, two months before his death.

- Computer Applications in Medicine 1964
- Fluid, Electrolyte, and Nutrient Therapy in Surgery 1974
- Surgical Treatment of Obesity 1981
- Problems in General Surgery: Surgical Treatment of Morbid Obesity 1992
- A Fat Chance A Surgical Paradigm of Obesity and Type-2 Diabetes April 20, 2021

== Personal life ==
During medical school, Mason met Dordana Fairman in 1944 while canoeing on the Iowa River at the University of Iowa and married her in the same year. Dordana worked as a dietitian for the University of Iowa Hospitals and worked counselling patients with anorexia nervosa, while her husband worked with obese patients. They were married for 71 years until she died at age 93 of heart failure on September 17, 2015. Ed and Dordana Mason had 4 children, Dan, RoseMary, Richard, and Charles Henry, as well as several grandchildren and great-grandchildren.

== End of life, death, and legacy ==
During his 90s, Mason actively travelled to meetings around the US to speak about obesity surgery and the treatment of diabetes. In 2011 he was a speaker at the 97th Annual American College of Surgeons in San Francisco. In 2013, he was awarded the Medallion for the Advancement of Surgical Care by the American Surgical Association for his lifelong leadership in the fight against obesity and its associated health problems. He was considered the "father of obesity surgery". He gave the 26th Annual Mason Lecture at the American Society for Metabolic and Bariatric Surgery Annual Meeting in 2014. Mason wrote several articles for the Bariatric Times, a monthly magazine for surgeons, physicians, nurses, and other healthcare professionals in the field of bariatrics.

After his wife Dordana died in 2015, he continued living in his home one block from the University Hospital. In 2017, he moved to Walden's Place, a senior living community in Iowa City. He died under hospice care on December 29, 2020, two months after his 100th birthday. The cause of death, according to the death certificate, was a stroke due to hypertension and type-2 diabetes mellitus. His body was cremated and buried with the cremated ashes of his wife, Dordana, at the Oakland Cemetery in Iowa City.

His papers, books, and films of his early surgeries will be archived at the University of Iowa Library. As the "father of obesity surgery," he travelled to countries worldwide, including Japan, Taiwan, Australia (Tasmania), United Kingdom, Italy, Sweden, and Germany, to speak about safe and effective treatments for the morbidly obese. Edward and Dordana Mason established a Professorship in the UI Department of Surgery in 2006 to support the research of a UI faculty member in the field of obesity.
