= Bypass surgery =

Class of surgical intervention

- ICD-10-PCS: 0?1

Bypass surgery refers to a class of surgery involving rerouting a tubular body part.

Types include:

- Vascular bypass surgery such as coronary artery bypass surgery, a heart operation, in which the internal thoracic artery and great saphenous vein are used to bypass the coronary artery.
- Cardiopulmonary bypass, a technique used in coronary artery bypass surgery
  - In on-pump bypass surgery, a heart-lung machine is used; in off-pump bypass surgery, the surgeon stabilizes the heart without use of the machine.
- Weight loss or Bariatric surgery:
  - Vertical banded gastroplasty surgery or "stomach stapling", the upper part of the stomach is permanently stapled to create a smaller pouch
  - Adjustable gastric band or "lap band", a band creates a pocket in the stomach that can be adjusted with a port placed just under the skin
  - Roux-en-Y gastric bypass surgery, the small intestine is connected to the upper part of the stomach
  - Partial ileal bypass surgery, shortening the final portion of the small intestine
  - Popliteal bypass surgery, to treat diseased leg arteries above or below the knee
  - Jejunojejunostomy, surgery that connects two portions of small intestine and is no longer used
    - Ileojejunal bypass, surgery that connects the middle and final portions of the small intestine that was experimental and is no longer used.
