= Revision weight loss surgery =

Type of bariatric surgery

Revision weight loss surgery is a surgical procedure that is performed on patients who have already undergone a form of bariatric surgery, and have either had complications from such surgery or have not achieved significant weight loss results from the initial surgery. Procedures are usually performed laparoscopically, though open surgery may be required if prior bariatric surgery has resulted in extensive scarring.

With the increase in the number of weight loss surgeries performed every year, there are growing numbers of individuals who have experienced an unsatisfactory result from their bariatric procedures. There are several weight loss surgery options, some of which may limit later options for revision weight loss surgery.

== Procedures ==
- An adjustable gastric band is an inflatable silicone prosthetic device that is placed around the top portion of the stomach. This procedure can be performed as a revision procedure for many patients who have had a previous stomach stapling, gastroplasty procedure, or Roux-en-Y gastric bypass surgery but have regained weight. The procedure is normally performed laparoscopically, though in a small minority of instances prior surgery may have resulted in extensive scarring, requiring open surgery.
- Roux-en-Y gastric bypass is a commonly chosen revision technique, particularly in patients who have not been successful in meeting their weight loss goals after stomach stapling, gastroplasty, vertical gastric banding, or laparoscopic-adjustable gastric banding. Often the prior procedure still lends itself to a revision to become a Roux-en-Y gastric bypass. It may be performed laparoscopically, and the average recovery time is approximately two weeks. The weight loss success rate after Roux-en-Y gastric bypass revision surgery is generally excellent. There are some associated risks of vitamin deficiency and stomach ulcer formation requiring prevention with multivitamins and proton pump inhibitors.
- Sleeve gastrectomy removes a large portion of the stomach, with the remaining portion reshaped to become tube-like or sleeve-shaped. This creates an increased sense of satiety and decreased hunger in patients, often leading to weight loss and improved health. The procedure is generally less invasive than many other weight loss surgeries and has a lower potential for complications than may be associated with gastric bypass surgery.
- StomaphyX revision is a completely endoscopic revision technique used to tighten a stretched gastric pouch using internal sutures or fasteners. It may be used in patients who have had prior Roux-en-Y gastric bypass surgery and have a stretched stomach pouch.
