= Bariatric surgery =

Surgical procedure for management of obesity

- Other names: Weight loss surgery
- MeSH: D050110

Diagram showing upper gut before and after stomach bypass surgery.

Bariatric surgery (also known as metabolic surgery or weight loss surgery) is a group of surgical procedures used to manage obesity and related conditions. Long-term weight loss with bariatric surgery may be achieved through alteration of gut hormones, physical reduction of stomach size, reduction of nutrient absorption, or a combination of these. Standard of care procedures include Roux en-Y bypass, sleeve gastrectomy, and biliopancreatic diversion with duodenal switch, from which weight loss is largely achieved by altering gut hormone levels responsible for hunger and satiety, leading to a new hormonal weight set point.

In morbidly obese people, bariatric surgery is the most effective treatment for weight loss and reducing complications. A 2021 meta-analysis found that bariatric surgery was associated with reduction in all-cause mortality among obese adults with or without type 2 diabetes. This meta-analysis also found that median life-expectancy was 9.3 years longer for obese adults with diabetes who received bariatric surgery as compared to routine (non-surgical) care, whereas the life expectancy gain was 5.1 years for obese adults without diabetes. The risk of death in the period following surgery is less than 1 in 1,000. Bariatric surgery may also lower disease risk, including improvement in cardiovascular disease risk factors, fatty liver disease, and diabetes management.

Stomach reduction surgery is frequently used for cases where traditional weight loss approaches, consisting of diet and physical activity, have proven insufficient, or when obesity already significantly affects well-being and general health. These procedures involve reducing food intake. Some procedures may also reduce the absorption of carbohydrates, fats, calories, and protein. The outcome is typically a significant reduction in BMI. The efficacy of stomach reduction surgery varies depending on its specific type. There are two primary divisions: gastric sleeve surgery and gastric bypass surgery.

As of October 2022, the American Society of Metabolic and Bariatric Surgery and the International Federation for the Surgery of Obesity recommended consideration of bariatric surgery for adults meeting two specific criteria: those with a body mass index (BMI) of more than 35 whether or not they have an obesity-associated condition and those with a BMI of 30–35 who have metabolic syndrome. However, these designated BMI ranges do not hold the same meaning in particular populations, such as among Asians, for whom bariatric surgery may be considered when a BMI is more than 27.5. Similarly, the American Academy of Pediatrics recommends bariatric surgery for adolescents 13 and older with a BMI greater than 120% of the 95th percentile for age and sex.

== Medical uses ==
Bariatric surgery has proven to be the most effective obesity treatment option for enduring weight loss. Along with this weight reduction, the procedure reduces risk of cardiovascular diseases, type 2 diabetes, fatty liver disease, depression syndromes, among others. While often effective, numerous barriers to shared decision making between the medical provider and person affected include lack of insurance coverage or understanding how it functions, a lack of knowledge about procedures, conflicts with organizational priorities and care coordination, and tools supporting people who need the surgery.

=== Eligibility and guidelines ===
Historically, eligibility for bariatric surgery was defined as a BMI greater than 40, or a BMI more than 35 with an obesity-associated comorbidity, as based on the 1991 NIH Consensus Statement. In the three decades that followed, obesity rates continued to rise, laparoscopic surgical techniques made the procedure safer, and high-quality research showed effectiveness at improving health among various conditions. In October 2022, ASMBS/IFSO revised the eligibility criteria, which include all adult patients with a BMI greater than 35, and those with a BMI more than 30 with metabolic syndrome. However, BMI is a limited measurement, for which factors such as ethnicity are not used in the BMI calculation. Eligibility criteria for bariatric surgery are modified for people who identify as a part of the Asian population with a BMI of more than 27.5.

Stomach reduction surgeries were highly recommended for patients who meet these criteria: BMI>40 (type 3 obesity), BMI>35 (type 2 obesity), with specific comorbid conditions such as type 2 diabetes, hypertension, dyslipidemia, etc.

As of 2019, the American Academy of Pediatrics recommended bariatric surgery without age-based eligibility limits under the following indications: BMI more than 35 with severe comorbidity, such as obstructive sleep apnea (Apnea-Hypopnea Index above 0.5), type 2 diabetes, idiopathic intracranial hypertension, nonalcoholic steatohepatitis, Blount disease, slipped capital femoral epiphysis, gastroesophageal reflux disease, and idiopathic hypertension or a BMI above 40 without comorbidities. Surgery is contraindicated with a medically correctable cause of obesity, substance abuse, concurrent or planned pregnancy, eating disorder, or inability to adhere to postoperative recommendations and mandatory lifestyle changes.

When counseling a patient on bariatric procedures, providers take an interdisciplinary approach. Psychiatric screening is also critical for determining postoperative success. People with a BMI of 40 or greater have a 5-fold risk of depression, and half of bariatric surgery candidates are depressed. Among bariatric surgery candidates and those who undergo bariatric surgery, mental health-related conditions including anxiety disorders, eating disorders, and substance use are also more commonly reported.

==== Age ====
Elderly patients will face higher postoperative complications due to frailty of elderly patients. The adolescents who performed stomach reduction surgery showed better results and there is no negative impact on linear/puberty growth.

=== Contraindications ===
Stomach reduction surgery is not suitable for people with the following conditions:

- History of severe gastrointestinal disease:
  - Crohn's disease–RYGB surgery limited.
  - Active peptic ulcers disease.
  - Esophagitis in severe stage.
- Severe cardiovascular disease
  - Heart failure
  - Coronary artery disease
  - Portal hypertension
- Cancer: active cancer diagnosis
- Pregnancy: pregnant (within 12-18 month)
- Psychiatric: lower level of mental capacity or untreated mental disorders
- Blood clotting: Coagulopathy issue

=== Weight loss ===
In adults, malabsorptive procedures lead to more weight loss than restrictive procedures, but they have a higher risk profile. Gastric banding is the least invasive, so it may offer fewer complications, while gastric bypass may offer the highest initial and most sustainable weight loss. A single protocol is not superior to the other. In one 2019 systematic review, estimated weight loss (EWL) for each surgical protocol is as follows: 56.7% for gastric bypass, 45.9% for gastric banding, 74.1% for biliopancreatic bypass ± duodenal switch and 58.3% for sleeve gastrectomy. Most patients do remain obese (BMI 25-35) following surgery despite significant weight loss, and patients with BMI over 40 tended to lose more weight than those with BMI under 40.

Concerning metabolic syndrome, bariatric surgery patients were able to achieve remission 2.4 times as often as those who underwent nonsurgical treatment. No significant difference was noted for changes in cholesterol, or LDL, but HDL did increase in the surgical groups, and reduction in blood pressure was variable between studies.

=== Type 2 diabetes mellitus ===
Studies of bariatric surgery for type 2 diabetes (T2DM) within the obese population show that 58% prioritize the improvement of diabetes, while 33% pursued surgery for weight loss alone. While weight loss is essential in T2DM management, sustaining improvements long-term is challenging; 50% to 90% of people struggle to achieve adequate diabetes control, suggesting the need for alternative interventions. In this context, studies have reported an 85–90% resolution of T2DM after bariatric surgery, measured by reductions in fasting plasma glucose and HbA1C levels, and remission rates of up to 74% two years post-surgery. Bariatric surgery is considered for individuals with new-onset T2DM and obesity, although the level of improvement may be slightly less.

The relative risk reductions associated with bariatric surgery are 61%, 64%, and 77% for the development of T2DM, hypertension, and dyslipidemia, respectively, highlighting the efficacy of bariatric surgery in prevention as well as resolution of chronic obesity. Predictors for post-operative diabetes resolution include the current method of diabetes control, adequate blood sugar control, age, duration of diabetes, and waist circumference.

Bariatric surgery likewise plays a role in the reduction of medication use. During postoperative follow-up, 76% of people discontinued the use of insulin, while 62% no longer required T2DM medications at all.

=== Reduced mortality and morbidity ===
A 2021 meta-analysis found that bariatric surgery was associated with 59% and 30% reductions in all-cause mortality among obese adults with or without type 2 diabetes respectively. It also found that median life expectancy was 9 years longer for obese adults with diabetes who received bariatric surgery as compared to routine (non-surgical) care, whereas the life expectancy gain was 5 years longer for obese adults without diabetes. The overall cancer risk in bariatric surgery patients was decreased by 44%, especially in colorectal, endometrial, breast, and ovarian cancer. Improvements in cardiovascular health are the most well-described changes after bariatric surgery, with notable reductions in the incidence of stroke (except in patients with T2DM), heart attack, atrial fibrillation, all-cause cardiovascular mortality, and ischemic heart disease.

Bariatric surgery in older patients is a safety concern; the relative benefits and risks in this population are not known.

=== Fertility and pregnancy ===
In 2017, the American Society for Metabolic and Bariatric Surgery stated that it was not clear whether medical weight-loss treatments or bariatric surgery affected subsequent treatments for infertility in both men and women.

Bariatric surgery reduces the risk of gestational diabetes and hypertensive disorders of pregnancy in women who later become pregnant, but increases the risks of preterm birth and maternal anemia. A 2021 systematic review found that post-bariatric surgery normalized hormonal levels and menstrual cycles, and improved fertility, with no increased short-term risk of miscarriages or congenital malformations.

For women with polyendocrine metabolic ovarian syndrome (PMOS), post-operatively there tends to be a reduction in menstrual irregularity, hirsutism, infertility, and the overall prevalence of PMOS is reduced by bariatric surgery at 12 and 23 months.

=== Mental health ===
Among people seeking bariatric surgery, pre-operative mental health disorders are commonly reported. Some studies indicate that psychological health can improve after bariatric surgery, due in part to improved body image, self-esteem, and change in self-concept; these findings were found in children (see Considerations in adolescent patients below). Bariatric surgery has consistently been associated with postoperative decreases in depression symptoms and reduced severity.

== Risks and complications ==
Weight loss surgery in adults is associated with an elevated risk of complications compared to nonsurgical treatments for obesity. Complications can be separated into 2 stages, early complication (within 30 days after surgeries) and late complications (after 30 days).

The overall risk of mortality is low in bariatric surgery at 0 to .01%. Severe complications, such as gastric perforation or necrosis, have been significantly reduced by improved surgical experience and training. Bariatric surgery morbidity is also low at 5%. In fact, several studies have reported a reduced overall long-term all-cause mortality compared to controls. However, obese populations maintain an elevated risk of disease and mortality compared to the general population even after surgery, therefore elevated mortality after surgery may be related to the ongoing complications of existing obesity-related disease.

The percentage of procedures requiring reoperations due to complications was 8% for adjustable gastric banding, 6% after Roux-en-Y gastric bypass, 1% for sleeve gastrectomy, and 5% after biliopancreatic diversion. Over a 10-year study while using a common data model to allow for comparisons, 9% of patients who received a sleeve gastrectomy required some form of reoperation within 5 years compared to 12% of patients who received a Roux-en-Y gastric bypass. Both of the effects were fewer than those reported with adjustable gastric banding.

=== Postoperative ===
Laparoscopic bariatric surgery requires an average hospital stay of 2–5 days, barring potential complications. Minimally invasive procedures (i.e. adjustable gastric band) tend to have less complications than open procedures (i.e. Roux-en-Y). Similar to other surgical procedures, there is a risk of atelectasis (collapse of small airways) and pleural effusion (fluid buildup in lungs), and pneumonia which tends to be less associated with minimally invasive procedures.

Complications specific to the laparoscopic gastric band procedure include esophageal perforation from the advancement of the calibration probe, gastric perforation from the creation of a retrograde gastric tunnel, esophageal dilation, and acute dilation of the gastric pouch due to malpositioning of the gastric band. Gastric band malpositioning can be devastating, leading to gastric prolapse, overdistention, and resultingly, gastric ischemia and necrosis. Erosion and migration of the band may also occur post-operatively, in which case, if over 50% of the circumference of the band migrates, then surgical repositioning is necessary.

Risks of Roux-en-Y gastric bypass include anastomotic stenosis (narrowing of the intestine where the two segments are rejoined), bleeding, leaks, fistula formation, ulcers (ulcers near the rejoined segment), internal hernia, small bowel obstruction, kidney stones, and gallstones. Bowel obstruction tends to be more difficult to diagnose in post-bariatric surgery patients due to their reduced ability to vomit; symptoms mainly involve abdominal pain and are intermittent due to twisting and untwisting of the intestinal mesentery.

Sleeve gastrectomy also carries a small risk of stenosis, staple line leak, stricture formation, leaks, fistula formation, bleeding, and gastro-esophageal reflux disease (also known as GERD or heartburn).

Deficiencies of micronutrients like iron (15%), vitamin D, vitamin B12, fat-soluble vitamins, thiamine, and folate are common after bariatric procedures. Such deficiencies are potentiated by alterations in absorption and lack of appetite and often require supplementation. Notably, chronic vitamin D deficiency may contribute to osteoporosis; insufficiency fractures, especially of the upper extremity, are of higher incidence in bariatric surgery patients. Sleeve gastrectomy leads to fewer long-term vitamin deficiencies compared to gastric banding.

==== Sleeve gastrectomy (SG) ====
Early complication: Bleeding is present in approximately 5% of cases of sleeve gastrectomy. Symptoms can vary widely, ranging from gastrointestinal bleeding to internal bleeding. Venous thromboembolism (VTE) may occur, causing a decrease in flow through the splenic system, potentially leading to system collapse or death.

Late complications: They include gastric stenosis, nutrient deficiencies, and Gastroesophageal reflux disease. For gastric stenosis, the symptoms are food intolerance and vomiting. For the gastroesophageal reflux disease, which due to post-surgery changes of reduced lower esophageal sphincter tension and increased intragastric pressure. Patients may suffer from heartburn after eating or upper abdominal pain.

===== Roux-En-Y gastric bypass (RYGB) =====
An early complication of Roux-En-Y Gastric Bypass: Small bowel obstruction, which can be caused by the internal hernias due to the laparoscopic RYGB surgery techniques that were used. And it is life-threatening to patients since it is hard to diagnose through clinical or radiographic imaging. The symptoms included vomiting, abdominal pain and peritonitis. Common complications such as internal gastrointestinal hemorrhage (bleeding) and staple line leakage occur in both surgeries.

Late complication: For the anastomotic stricture, there is a 2.9%-23% chance for patients to experience gastrojejunal anastomosis. This complication more often occurs in the laparoscopic era than open RYGB surgery. Symptoms such as difficulty swallowing and vomiting.

=== Gastrointestinal ===
The most common complication, especially after sleeve gastrectomy, is GERD, which may occur in up to 25% of cases. Dumping syndrome (rapid emptying of undigested stomach contents) is another common complication of bariatric surgery, especially after Roux-en-Y, which is further classified into early and late dumping syndrome. Dumping syndrome in some cases may be associated with more efficient weight loss, however, it can be uncomfortable. Symptoms of dumping syndrome include nausea, diarrhea, painful abdominal cramps, bloating, and autonomic symptoms such as tachycardia, palpitations, flushing, and sweating. Early dumping syndrome (emptying within 1 hour of eating) is also associated with a rapid drop in blood pressure, which may cause fainting. Late dumping syndrome is characterized by low blood sugar 1–3 hours after a meal, presenting with palpitations, tremors, sweating, a feeling of faintness, and irritability. Dumping syndrome is best mitigated by consuming small meals and avoiding high carb or high-fat foods.

=== Gallstones ===
Rapid weight loss after obesity surgery can contribute to the development of gallstones, especially at 6 and 18 months. Estimates for prevalence of symptomatic gallstones after Roux-En-Y gastric bypass range from 3–13%. The risk of gallstones following bariatric surgery has shown to be higher among those of the female sex.

=== Kidney stones ===
Kidney stones are common after Roux-En-Y gastric bypass, with estimates of prevalence ranging from 7-11%. All surgical modalities are associated with a significant increase in the risk of kidney stones compared to nonsurgical weight loss treatment, with biliopancreatic diversion being the most associated at a ten-fold increase in one study.

=== Micronutrient malnutrition ===
Bariatric surgery as a treatment for obesity can lead to vitamin deficiencies. Long-term follow-up reported deficiencies for vitamins D, E, A, K and B12. There are guidelines for multivitamin supplementation, but adherence rates are reported to be less than 20%.

=== Bone health ===
Bariatric surgery has negative effects on bone health, including a decrease in bone density and increased risk of fragility fractures. Suggested mechanisms for this effect include reduced dietary intake of calcium and vitamin D, muscle and skeletal unloading, nutrient malabsorption of and changes in the secretion of gut hormones. Professional society guidelines recommend assessment of bone density using DXA two years after bariatric surgery. Notably, the trabecular bone score may underestimate bone microarchitecture quality in bariatric surgery patients due to extreme waist circumference and soft tissue thickness.

=== Pregnancy ===
Pregnancy in patients post-bariatric surgery must be carefully monitored. Infant mortality, preterm birth, small fetal size, congenital anomalies, and NICU admission are all elevated in bariatric surgery patients. This elevation in adverse outcomes is thought to be because of malnutrition. Most notably, a reduction in serum folate and iron are well-established correlates to neural tube defects and preterm birth, respectively. People considering pregnancy should consult with their physician before conceiving to optimize their health and nutritional status before pregnancy.

== Technique ==
=== Mechanisms of action ===
Bariatric procedures function by a variety of mechanisms, such as alteration of gut hormones, reduction of the gut size (reducing the amount of food that may pass through), and reduction or blockage of nutrient absorption. The distinction in these mechanisms, and which are at work for a particular bariatric procedure is not always clearly defined, as multiple mechanisms may be used by a single procedure. For instance, while sleeve gastrectomy (discussed below) was initially thought to work simply by reducing the size of the stomach, research has begun to elucidate changes in gut hormone signaling as well. The two most frequently performed procedures are sleeve gastrectomy and Roux-en-Y gastric bypass (also called gastric bypass), with sleeve gastrectomy accounting for more than half of all procedures since 2014.

==== Hormone regulation ====
Studies have shown that bariatric procedures may have additional effects on the hormones that affect hunger and satiety (such as ghrelin and leptin), despite initial development to target reduction of food intake and/or nutrient absorption. This is especially important when considering the durability of weight loss compared to lifestyle changes. While diet and exercise are essential for maintaining a healthy weight and physical fitness, metabolism typically slows as the individual loses weight, a process known as metabolic adaptation. Thus, efforts for obese individuals to lose weight often stall, or result in weight re-gain. Bariatric surgery is thought to affect the weight "set point," leading to a more durable weight loss. This is not completely understood but may involve the cell-signaling pathways and hunger/satiety hormones.

==== Restricting food intake ====
Procedures may reduce food intake by reducing the size of the stomach that is available to hold a meal (see below: gastric sleeve or stomach folding). Filling the stomach faster enables an individual to feel more full after a smaller meal.

==== Nutrient absorption ====
Procedures may reduce the amount of intestine that food passes through to decrease the absorption of nutrients from food. For example, a Roux-en-Y gastric bypass connects the stomach to a more distal part of the intestine, which reduces the ability of the intestines to absorb nutrients from the food.

==== Disruption of the gut-brain axis by partial vagotomy ====
Roux-en-Y gastric bypass disrupts the gastric branches of the vagal nerve completely and sleeve gastrectomy does so partially. Before current bariatriac was introduced, isolated vagotomy was used for the treatment of obesity. Vagotomy leads to a reduction of gastric acid and consequently to a reduction in nutrient absorption and a delay in gastric emptying. In addition, the effect of the hunger hormone Ghrelin is reduced, because it acts through the vagal nerve. This leads to a reduction of the hunger feeling and weight loss.

=== Most common techniques ===
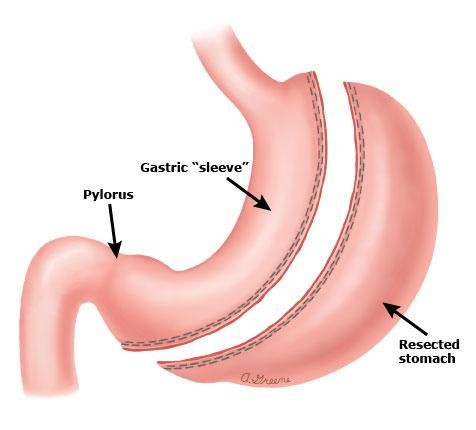
Image of sleeve gastrectomy showing the reduced, new stomach (the gastric sleeve) and the removed stomach tissue (resected stomach).

==== Sleeve gastrectomy ====
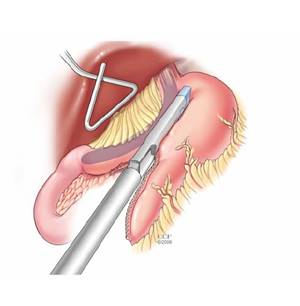
Gastrectomy.

Sleeve gastrectomy, also known as a gastric sleeve, is a surgical weight-loss procedure where the stomach size is reduced by the surgical removal of a large portion of the stomach, following along the major curve of the stomach. The open edges are then attached (typically with surgical staples, sutures, or both) to leave the stomach shaped more like a tube, or a sleeve, with a banana shape.

The procedure is performed laparoscopically and is not reversible. It has been found to produce a weight loss comparable to that of Roux-en-Y gastric bypass. The risk of ulcers or narrowing of the gut due to intestinal strictures is less so with sleeve gastrectomy versus Roux-en-Y gastric bypass, but it is not as effective at treating GERD or type 2 diabetes.

This was the most commonly performed bariatric surgery as of 2021 in the United States, and is one of the two most commonly performed bariatric surgeries in the world. Though initially thought to work strictly by reducing the size of the stomach, recent research has shown that there are also changes in gut signaling hormones with this procedure leading to weight loss.

The sleeve gastrectomy mechanism works by creating a narrow gastric lumen which restricts food intake and prevents receptive relaxation, alongside ongoing research into hormonal changes, and gastrointestinal motility.

The physical mechanism that will make the SG stand out to other bariatric surgery is its reduction of the storage of the stomach significantly, allowing patients to control their calorie intakes.

The mechanism related to hormone regulation, SG can help to improve Insulin sensitivity, aiming for better glucose regulation and contributing to the remission of type 2 diabetes in many patients. The levels of gut hormones such as GLP-1 and PYY increase after operation of SG. GLP-1 enhances insulin secretion and has a satiety-inducing effect, while PYY helps reduce appetite. These hormonal changes are pivotal in the metabolic improvements observed after SG, including better control of blood sugar levels and reduced hunger.

SG will affect the metabolism and absorption of nutrients, hence causing an effect on nutrient dynamics. Postoperative observation shows patients' nutrient levels of Vitamin B1 and B12 have significantly declined, necessitating careful postoperative nutritional management to prevent deficiencies.

Research suggests SG surgery can alter the composition of the gut microbiota, which plays a role in obesity and metabolic health. Changes in the gut microbial community post-SG may influence energy harvest from the diet, impact inflammatory pathways, and affect the host's metabolic profile.

The key mechanism is gastrointestinal motility adjustment of SG surgery, which impacts the speed and efficiency of food processing. Studies have observed a modification in the pressure of the lower esophageal sphincter and an increase in intragastric pressure post-surgery, which collectively impact the gastrointestinal motility.

Techniques:

- Hiatal Hernia Repair. During SG, identifying and repairing a hiatal hernia (HH) is a significant step that can influence the surgery's outcome, especially concerning gastroesophageal reflux disease (GERD) management postoperatively. The procedure involves dissecting the pars flaccida to open a plane between the right crus of the liver and the esophagus, performing an intrathoracic esophageal dissection, and identifying the left crus. A hiatal hernia repair is conducted, if necessary, with a posterior cruroplasty using a durable suture material. This step is vital as it ensures the proper positioning of the gastroesophageal junction (GEJ) and reduces the risk of postoperative GERD by securing the stomach below the diaphragm, preventing potential acid reflux.
- Bougie Sizing and Stapling Alongside. The insertion of a bougie during LSG is a crucial technique for guiding the creation of the gastric sleeve. The bougie, which ranges from 38 to 40 French in size, is inserted down to the pylorus under direct visualisation, serving as a mold around which the stomach is stapled and resected. This technique ensures that the sleeve is of uniform size and reduces the risk of narrowing a passage or obstruction post-surgery. Stapling begins 3–6 cm from the pylorus and proceeds upwards towards the angle of His, closely aligned with the bougie to create a narrow gastric tube. The careful placement and size of the bougie are instrumental in achieving optimal sleeve shape and function, minimising complications such as leaks or strictures.

After 1-3 postoperative days, patients begin oral intake, contingent on a successful gastrografin leak test, and receive continuous metabolic monitoring. To reduce early respiratory risk, prophylactic measures such as oxygen support and ultrasound evaluations are employed.

Late postoperative care involves careful observation for anastomotic leaks, patient change to a clear liquid diet, and managing potential nausea and vomiting. After discharge, the focus shifts to dietary management, starting with a full liquid diet and gradually incorporating soft, solid foods. Monitoring includes regular check-ups for weight and blood pressure, along with comprehensive lab tests to ensure optimal recovery.

==== Roux-en-Y gastric bypass surgery ====
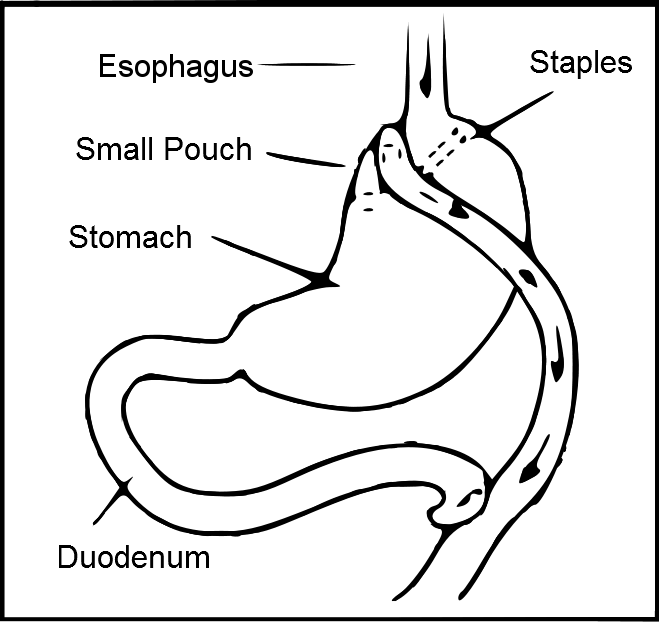
Image of Roux-en-Y gastric bypass showing the new connection, formed by staples, of the smaller portion of the stomach connected to a further part of the small intestine.

Roux-en-Y gastric bypass.

Roux-en-Y gastric bypass surgery involves the creation of a new connection in the gastrointestinal tract, from a smaller portion of the stomach to the middle of the small intestine.

The surgery is a permanent procedure that aims to decrease the absorption of nutrients due to the new, limited connection created. The surgery also works by affecting gut hormones, resetting hunger and satiety levels. The physically smaller stomach and increase in baseline satiety hormones help people to feel full with less food after the surgery.

This is the most commonly performed operation for weight loss in the United States, with approximately 140,000 gastric bypass procedures performed in 2005. A 2021 evidence update comparing the benefits and harms of bariatric procedures found that Roux-en-Y gastric bypass surgery and sleeve gastrectomy both effectively reduced weight and led to Type 2 diabetes remission. After five years, Roux-en-Y resulted in greater weight loss (26% compared to 19% for sleeve gastrectomy) and a 25% lower rate of diabetes relapse. However, Roux-en-Y patients had a higher likelihood of hospitalization and additional abdominal surgeries compared to sleeve gastrectomy. Though, since 2013, sleeve gastrectomy has overtaken RYGB as the most common bariatric procedure. RYGB remains one of the two most commonly performed bariatric surgeries in the world.

Gastric bypass is the most frequently employed technique for weight reduction, the abnormal absorption in the intestines and the physical restriction of the stomach. The types of surgeries can be categorized by the effects and the changes made. Reconstruction of the small intestine to reduce the mucosal area which is used to absorb nutrients is called the Malabsorption operation. The jejunoileal bypass (JIB) is the most traditional technique for gastric bypass. This procedure has no limitations in the flow and processing of food; it only allows the transport of nutrients from the small intestine to the surrounding areas of the intestine. The impact of weight loss is apparent and remarkable. Individuals who undergo Roux-en-Y gastric bypass (RYGB) consume fewer snacks and meals compared to those who undergo JIB. The RYGB procedure has been proved to be the most effective medical treatment for type 2 diabetes and weight loss. A decrease in the two hormones related to obesity, leptin and insulin, can be observed after performing gastric bypass surgery.

Roux-en-Y (RYGB) offers two surgical approaches for processing: an open technique or the laparoscopic technique. The majority of cases are still performed with laparoscopy. The laparoscopic approach is a safe procedure that is associated with fewer problems resulting from wound inflammation.

There are three main areas of techniques for performing laparoscopic RYGB: (1) Anastomotic technique including Linear Circular stapler. 2) Alimentary limb configuration, such as Antecolic or Retrocolic and Antegastric or Retrogastric. 3) Limb-length of the bilio-pancreatic (BP) limb.

Linear stapling: this technique has two variations. 1) Perform the jejuno-jejunal (JJ) anastomosis, then act on the gastro-jejunal (GJ) anastomosis. 2) reverse the first process.

Jejuno-jejunal first: This technique is prevalent within gastric bypass surgery.

JJ Anastomosis
In order to facilitate identification of duodenum-jejunum (DJ) flexion and Treitz ligaments, it will act on the Cephalic greater omentum using the laparoscopic staplers and Surgical energy device separate the mesentery. It also includes measuring the Roux limb between the distal end of the binding and the chosen length. For example, if the weight index is 40, the length should be 100 cm.
Gastric pouch formation
On the lesser curve of the stomach, a window will be opened between the second and third vessel at the perigastric border. The pouch will be formed using the laparoscopic stapling device. The orogastric tube which will be removed before the first launch of the stapler horizontally. The pouch is produced over the tube with next firings in another direction. These may need the mobilisation to help further divide the stomach.
Gastro-jejunal anastomosis
Gastrostomy is created at the specific angle (the part of the pouch with the least blood supply). The separated alimentary limbs are translocated to the pouch antecolically. Enterotomy will processed within the jejunum. At the same time, between the gastric pouch and alimentary limb, the laparoscopic stapling devices create the single firing. According to the JJ anastomosis, the anastomotic defect closes with 2 continuously absorbed sutures. Finally, 50 ml of Dilute methylene blue dye is needed to assess leakage and ensure anastomotic integrity.

Other techniques include the Omega Loop Technique and Trans-abdominal technique employ different operating approaches along with different process orders. All of them will show positive weight loss results. Ileal interposition has been used for weight loss in patients with diabetes.

The duration of the recuperation phase typically ranges from 2 to 4 weeks. The length of the period is dependent upon the self-perception of the patients and their future state of mental and physical ability. For patients to resume their normal activities, a minimum of 3–5 weeks recovery period is required. Doctors should determine the length of the recovery period based on a range of body mass index.

==== Biliopancreatic diversion with duodenal switch ====
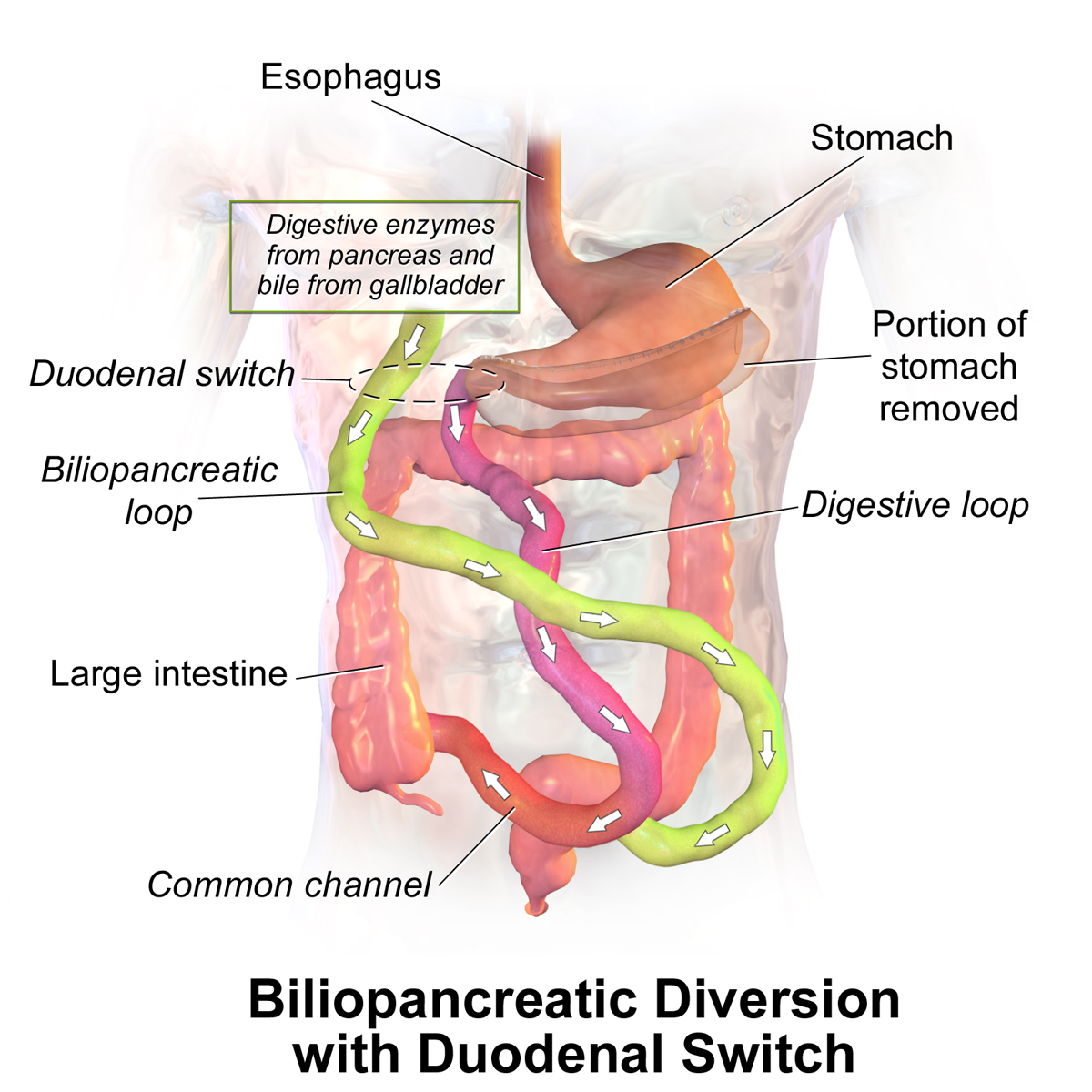
Biliopancreatic diversion

The biliopancreatic diversion with duodenal switch (BPD/DS) is a slightly less common bariatric procedure, but is increasing in use with proven efficacy for sustainable weight loss.

This procedure has multiple steps. First, a sleeve gastrectomy (see above section) is performed. This part of the procedure causes food intake restriction due to the physical reduction of the stomach size, and is permanent. Next, the stomach is then disconnected from the upper part of the small intestine and connected to a farther part of the small intestine (ileum), creating the alimentary limb. The leftover section of the far part of the small intestine is then used to make a connection that brings digestive fluids from the gallbladder and pancreas to the alimentary limb.

Weight loss following the surgery is largely due to the alteration of gut hormones that control hunger and satiety, as well as the physical restriction of the stomach and decrease in nutrient absorption. Compared to the sleeve gastrectomy and Roux-en-Y gastric bypass, BPD/DS produces better results with lasting weight loss and resolution of type 2 diabetes.

=== Other related bariatric procedures ===
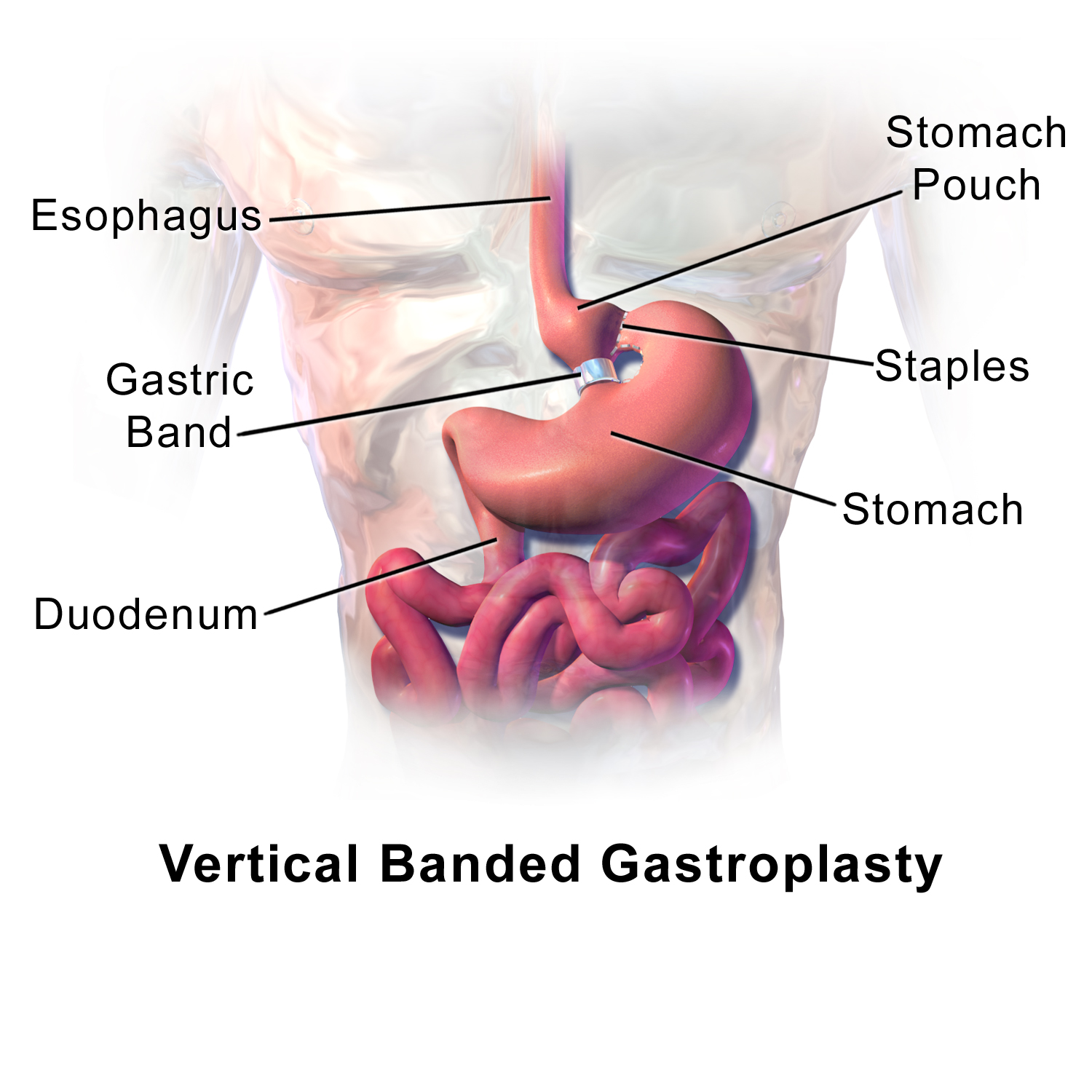
Image of a Vertical banded gastroplasty showing staples and a gastric band creating the reduced, new stomach (labeled stomach pouch in the image).

==== Vertical banded gastroplasty ====
Vertical banded gastroplasty was more commonly used in the 1980s, and is not typically performed in the 21st century.

In the vertical banded gastroplasty, a part of the stomach is permanently stapled to create a smaller, new stomach. This new stomach is physically restricted, allowing people to feel full with smaller meals. Short-term weight loss is similar to other bariatric procedures, but long-term complications may be higher.

==== Gastric plication ====
This procedure is similar to the sleeve gastrectomy surgery, but a sleeve is created by suturing, rather than physically removing stomach tissue. This allows for the natural ability of the stomach to absorb nutrients to remain intact. This procedure is reversible, is a less invasive procedure, and does not use hardware or staples.

Gastric plication significantly reduces the volume of the patient's stomach, so smaller amounts of food provide a feeling of satiety. In a 2020 review and meta-analysis, long-term weight loss was not as durable as other, more common bariatric techniques. Gastric plication has not performed as well as the sleeve gastrectomy, with the sleeve gastrectomy associated with greater weight loss and fewer complications.

=== Implants and devices ===
==== Adjustable gastric band ====
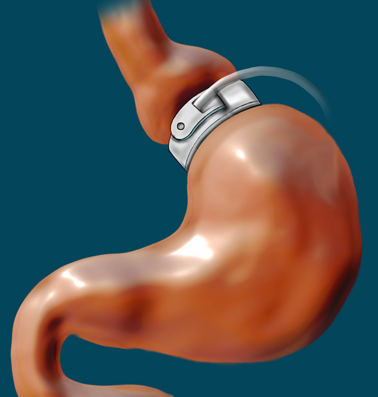
Image of an adjustable gastric band in place over the upper portion of the stomach

The restriction of the stomach also can be created using a silicone band, which can be adjusted by the addition or removal of saline through a port placed just under the skin, a procedure called adjustable gastric band surgery. This operation can be performed laparoscopically, and is commonly referred to as a "lap band". Weight loss is predominantly due to the restriction of nutrient intake that is created by the small gastric pouch and the narrow outlet. It is considered somewhat of a safe surgical procedure, with a mortality rate of 0.05%.

==== Intragastric balloon ====
Intragastric balloon involves placing a deflated balloon into the stomach, and then filling it to decrease the amount of gastric space, resulting in the feeling of fullness after a smaller meal. The balloon can be left in the stomach for a maximum of 6 months and results in weight loss of 3 BMI or 3–8 kg within several study ranges. Weight loss with the gastric balloon tends to be more modest than other interventions. The intragastric balloon may be used before another bariatric surgery to assist the patient in reaching a weight that is suitable for surgery but can be used repeatedly and unrelated to other procedures.

==== Implantable gastric stimulation ====
This procedure where a device similar to a heart pacemaker that is implanted by a surgeon, with the electrical leads stimulating the external surface of the stomach, was under preliminary research in 2015. Electrical stimulation is thought to modify the activity of the enteric nervous system of the stomach, which is interpreted by the brain to give a sense of satiety, or fullness. Early evidence suggests that it is less effective than other forms of bariatric surgery.

== Recovery ==
People are followed closely both before and after bariatric procedures by a healthcare team. The care team may include people in a variety of disciplines, such as social workers, dietitians, and medical weight management specialists. Follow-up after surgery is typically focused on helping avoid complications and tracking the progress toward body weight goals. Having a structure of social support in the post-operative time may be beneficial as people work through the changes that present physically and emotionally following surgery.

=== Dietary recommendations ===
Dietary restrictions after recovery from surgery depend in part on the type of surgery. In general, immediately after bariatric surgery, the person is restricted to a clear liquid diet, which includes foods such as broth, diluted fruit juices, or sugar-free drinks. This diet is continued until the gastrointestinal tract begins to recover approximately 2–3 weeks after surgery. The next stage provides a puréed liquid or soft-solid diet that is slightly increased in viscosity. This may consist of high protein, liquid, or soft foods such as protein shakes, soft meats, and dairy products. People in recovery are encouraged to compose their diet mainly of plant-based foods and soft proteins (1.0–1.5g/kg/day). During recovery, people must adapt to eating more slowly and avoid eating past fullness; overeating may lead to nausea and vomiting. Alcohol is avoided completely in the first 6 months to 1 year after surgery. Some people may take a daily multivitamin to compensate for reduced absorption of essential nutrients.

=== Fertility and family planning ===
In general, women are advised to avoid pregnancy for 12–24 months after bariatric surgery to reduce the possibility of intrauterine growth restriction or nutrient deficiency, since a person having bariatric surgery will likely undergo significant weight loss and changes in metabolism. Over many years, the rates of potential adverse maternal and fetal outcomes have been reduced for mothers following bariatric surgery.

=== Post-operative bariatric plastic surgery ===
After a person successfully loses weight following bariatric surgery, excess skin may occur. Bariatric plastic surgery procedures, sometimes called body contouring, may be an option for people wishing to remove excess skin following the large change in weight. Targeted areas include the arms, buttocks and thighs, abdomen, and breasts, with changes occurring slowly over years.

== Society and culture ==
The rising prevalence of lawsuits related to gastric bypass surgery is a legal concern in different countries. The causes are complex, including the immature characteristics of this technology and an increasing number of patients. In the future, the number of emergent patients who have stomach reduction surgery, long-term complications, and the number of lawsuits due to non-eligible surgery will increase.

=== Economic implications ===
In the 21st century, obesity rates increased globally, and with this, a proportional rise in related diseases and complication. In the United States during 2017-20, an estimated 40% of adults were obese, up from 30% in 1999-2000. The costs of treating obesity and related conditions has a large economic impact globally. This economic impact results from direct treatment of obesity, treatment of obesity-related conditions, as well as other economic losses from decreased workforce productivity.

Bariatric surgery is cost-effective when compared to savings estimated from treatment or prevention of obesity-related conditions. Cost-effectiveness occurs at the individual level due to fewer healthcare expenses for medications, and nationally with a reduction in the overall lifetime healthcare costs.

== Special populations ==
=== Adolescents ===
During the early 21st century, obesity among children and adolescents increased globally, as did treatment options including lifestyle changes, drug treatments, and surgical procedures. The medical complications and health concerns associated with childhood obesity may have short or long-term effects, with a growing concern of a potential decline in overall life expectancy. Childhood obesity may affect mental health and impact eating practices.

Difficulties surrounding obesity treatment selection among children and adolescents include ethical considerations when obtaining consent from those who may be unable to do so without adult guidance or understanding the potential lasting effects of invasive procedures. Among high-quality randomized control trial data for surgical treatment of obesity, many studies are not specific to children and adolescents. Concerns for bullying about overweight or body image exist for those with childhood obesity; self-harm among children and adolescents bullied for their weight also occurs.

Bariatric surgical procedures available to adolescents include: Roux-en-Y gastric bypass, vertical sleeve gastrectomy, and adjustable gastric banding. Multiple organizations have created guidelines for bariatric surgery indications in children and adolescents. In 2022-23, such guidelines overlapped with recommendations for potential bariatric surgical management in children and adolescents with a BMI of 40 or higher, or a BMI of 35 or higher while also experiencing related experiences.

Reviews have shown similar weight loss in adolescents following bariatric surgery as in adults. Reduction of eating disorders for several years after bariatric surgery has also been shown in adolescents after bariatric surgery. Long-term reduction in or resolution of weight-related conditions, such as diabetes and high blood pressure, occurred in adolescents after bariatric surgery. Long-term effects of bariatric surgery in adolescents remains under research, as of 2023.

== History ==
Techniques for weight loss have been reported for decades, with a more formal transition to noting weight loss following surgical intervention in the 1950s when subsequent weight loss after surgical shortening of the small intestine in dogs and people was observed. Specifically, anastomosis between upper and lower portions of the small intestine to skip, or bypass, part of the small intestine led to what was called the jejuno-ileal bypass. A modified version of this procedure showed long-term improvement of lipid levels in people with known high levels of cholesterol following the procedure.

Further modification of the bypass procedure achieved weight loss in obesity, during which an anastomosis between the small intestine and upper lower intestine, known as a jejunocolic bypass, was performed. During the late 1960s, the initiation of bariatric surgery followed the development of a procedure to bypass portions of the stomach – the gastric bypass.

Sleeve gastrectomy (SG), is one of the most popular stomach reduction surgeries and was earliest performed in 1990 as a first-stage operation of duodenal switch (DS) surgery. Patients who go through SG typically experience substantial weight loss, preventing the need for the second phase of DS.

Laparoscopic techniques revolutionized bariatric surgery, making procedures less invasive and recovery quicker. The first laparoscopic gastric bypass performed by Alan Wittgrove in 1994 exemplifies this leap in surgical innovation. The SG laparoscopic version was first performed in 1999.

Historically, the RYGBP is the best bariatric surgery for obese patients, but now being rivalled by the SG. The complication of RYGBP leads people to find less intricate and safer surgeries, the complication including internal hernias and anastomotic complications. Nowadays, SG has a lower risk of complication, and the mortality rate has become the more favorable option for the patients.

== See also ==
- Revision weight loss surgery
- Endoscopic sleeve gastroplasty
