= Endoscopic sleeve gastroplasty =

Minimally-invasive weight-loss procedure

- Specialty: Gastroenterology, bariatrics

In medicine, endoscopic sleeve gastroplasty (ESG) is a minimally-invasive, non-surgical (incisionless), endoscopic weight loss procedure that is part of the field of endoscopic bariatric therapies. To perform ESG, a physician sutures a patient's stomach into a narrower, smaller tube-like configuration. The result is a more restricted stomach that forces patients to feel fuller sooner, eating fewer calories, which facilitates weight loss.

== History ==
Early iterations of endoscopic gastric remodeling for weight loss included the endoluminal vertical gastroplasty, which attempted to mimic the restricted stomach configuration of the vertical sleeve gastrectomy. Around the same time, similar endoscopic remodeling along the stomach's larger curvature was performed through tissue acquisition with a suction-based device, though this was limited by suture loss. In 2012, Dr. Christopher Thompson, a Harvard Medical School professor and later co-founder of Everself (formerly known as Bariendo), performed the first ESG case in humans. This was modified and tissue was acquired with a full-thickness suturing device, which has been the basis of the present ESG procedure. In July 2022, the creation of the ESG using the Apollo Overstitch device was authorized by the United States Food and Drug Administration for the treatment of obesity in patients with a body mass index between 30 and 50 kg/m^{2}.

== Description ==
The ESG may be performed with slight variations by different physicians. It most commonly is performed using the Apollo ESG Device (formally Overstitch device). This device fits over a therapeutic double-channel endoscope to create a sutured row of stomach tissue. The tissue helix is advanced from the endoscope, put up against stomach tissue, and turned 2-4 rotations to access the gastric muscle layer. The helix is then retracted towards the scope, bringing the full-thickness acquired stomach tissue with it. Using the handle-operated needle driver, a needle attached to the suture wire is passed through the full-thickness tissue to the anchor exchange. This creates a full-thickness plication of stomach tissue. The needle is then passed back from the anchor exchange to the needle driver, and the process is repeated, threading the suture wire through each bite of stomach tissue. When enough full-thickness bites have been taken for a suture row, a cinch is passed through the scope over the suture. Typically, sutures are placed starting at the border of the antrum and gastric body at the incisura, then placed proximally up to the border of the gastric body and fundus. Each row of sutures can be a straight line or one of the variety of suture patterns reported in the literature, such as the "M," "Z," and "U" pattern as well as other novel patterns; nonetheless, to date, no suture pattern has been proven to be superior for weight loss. Regardless of suture pattern, creation of the ESG focuses on tissue imbrication along the greater curvature of the stomach. The fundus is typically avoided due to the relatively thinner wall compared to the gastric body to avoid complications from the procedure.

=== Providers and locations for ESG performance ===
Accredited advanced fellowship training programs in ESG and other endoscopic bariatric therapies are currently rare, and competency in ESG is typically achieved through proctoring by experts after completion of an accredited gastroenterology or surgical training program. Studies have reported that efficiency with performance of ESG and improved weight loss outcomes occur after approximately 35-38 cases. Mastery was reported in one study to occur after 55 cases. While early performance of the ESG has traditionally been carried out in university-affiliated/academic centers, ESG has been shown to be feasible and safe when performed in the community setting.

== Outcomes ==
The primary measures of weight loss outcomes for endoscopic bariatric therapies include total body weight loss (percentage of pre-procedure weight lost by a certain time point) and excess weight loss (percentage of pre-procedure weight above ideal body weight that is lost by a certain time point). The Preservation and Incorporation of Valuable Endoscopic Innovation thresholds is an expert panel with gastroenterologists and surgeons from the American Society for Gastrointestinal Endoscopy and The American Society for Metabolic and Bariatric Surgery, and in 2015, this panel recommended that any new endoscopic therapy for weight loss should have an excess weight loss exceeding 25% and a serious adverse event rate less than 5%. Total body weight loss thresholds were not defined but are generally considered meaningful in novel endoscopic bariatric therapies if exceeding 5%. Multiple studies of ESG have shown that this therapy satisfies these criteria, as outlined below.

=== Weight loss outcomes ===
==== Multicenter ESG Randomized Trial (MERIT) ====
The recently published MERIT study is the first and only randomized controlled trial of the ESG for treatment of obesity and included 209 adult subjects with class I and II obesity (BMI 30–40 kg/m^{2}). It was conducted from Dec. 2017 to Jun. 2019, spanned nine centers in the United States, and comprised 85 adults in the ESG arm and 124 adults in the control arm (lifestyle modification only). Subjects in the ESG arm lost 13.6% of body weight and 49.2% of excess body weight at one year, compared to 0.8% total body weight loss and 3.2% excess weight loss in the control arm at the same time point.

==== Weight loss ====
Prior to the MERIT study, numerous meta-analyses of studies on ESG report a total body weight loss of approximately 16% at one year. Excess weight loss was observed to be approximately 60% at one year. Weight loss reported from high volume community practices that have both expertise in ESG and robust longitudinal aftercare programs with dietitians have shown even greater outcomes, with total body weight loss approaching 30% and excess weight loss of 66% at one year.

==== Predictors of greater weight loss ====
Patient selection is an important consideration for any weight loss therapy. The present published literature shows either no influence or conflicting results for patient age, sex, starting weight/BMI on weight loss from ESG. Long-term after care programs have demonstrated benefit for sustained weight loss after ESG, with one study showing that patients who continued after care visits following ESG had 20.5% total body weight loss compared to 16.9% total body weight loss in those who dropped out of long-term follow up programs.

==== Weight-related comorbidities ====
There are over 200 obesity-related comorbidities, and it has been reported that achieving a total body weight loss of 10% has a significant impact of such conditions. Thus, the weight loss outcomes with ESG are unsurprisingly accompanied by an improvement in several obesity-related comorbidities. Weight loss facilitated by ESG has been observed to bring about benefits in or even cure of diabetes/insulin sensitivity, dyslipidemia, blood pressure, and fatty liver disease, as well as quality of life. The MERIT study showed 80% of patients who underwent ESG had improvement in one or more comorbidities at one year.

=== Durability ===
Mid-term durability from ESG appears promising. A total body weight loss of 17% and excess weight loss of between approximately 60-67% was observed to be sustained at 18–24 months. This was later confirmed in the multicenter, randomized controlled MERIT study, which observed that 68% of subjects who underwent an ESG maintained 25% or more of their excess weight loss at two years. As a novel therapy, ESG presently lacks studies assessing long-term durability, though more data on this component of ESG are anticipated as more ESGs are performed over time. One recent study observed at 5 years from ESG that at least 10% total body weight loss was maintained in 90% of patients and at least 15% total body weight loss was maintained in 61% of patients.

=== Safety ===
Mild to moderate gastrointestinal side effects (such as nausea, cramping, bloating, and abdominal discomfort) are common after ESG (reported in over 70% of patients), but these are predictable, temporary, and can be managed with medications. Most will resolve within one week after ESG. Due to the minimally invasive nature of ESG, serious complications are rare. These include pain or nausea requiring hospitalization (1.08%); upper gastrointestinal tract bleeding (0.56%); peri-gastric leak or infected fluid collection (0.48%); pulmonary embolism (0.06%); perforation (0.06%). Similar rates of serious adverse events were reported in the multicenter, randomized controlled MERIT study. No deaths have been observed in the published ESG literature.

== Physiologic mechanisms of weight loss from ESG ==
=== Peripheral appetite signaling/gastric sensorimotor function ===
Mechanisms of weight loss from ESG remains an area of active study. There are at least two mechanisms of peripheral appetite signaling thought to be mediated by ESG: first, increased sense of fullness during a meal leading to meal termination, potentially a result of the intact gastric fundus that serves as a food reservoir and the restriction to gastric expansion (accommodation) during a meal; and second, from delayed emptying of the stomach, which promotes a prolonged sensation of fullness after a meal.

=== Hunger and satiety hormones ===
Unlike the surgical sleeve gastrectomy, the ESG does not appear to affect central appetite signaling through the hunger hormone, ghrelin. This is thought to be because the surgical sleeve removes the fundus, the primary site of ghrelin production, and the relatively thinner-walled fundus is avoided in the ESG for safety concerns. Furthermore, in cases where the fundus was sutured in ESG, this did not benefit weight loss outcomes.

== Further application of ESG with other weight loss treatments ==
=== Combination ESG and pharmacologic therapy ===
ESG can safely be combined with weight loss medications to improve weight loss or prevent weight regain after the procedure. The daily injectable medication liraglutide showed greater total body weight loss when combined with ESG compared to ESG alone at 7 months (approximately 25% vs 20% respectively). Similar results are anticipated with other incretin agents, such as semaglutide and tirzepatide, though no studies have directly assessed these combinations.

=== ESG after surgical sleeve gastrectomy (Revisional ESG) ===
Weight regain after surgical sleeve gastrectomy has historically been managed with medications or a more invasive revisional surgery. Recent data suggested that an ESG can safely be performed after the surgical sleeve gastrectomy (sometimes referred to as a "revisional ESG"), with total body weight loss of approximately 16-18% at 12 months. While weight loss is not thought to be as robust as the initial weight loss surgery, the revisional ESG has an improved safety profile compared to a surgical revision and is therefore hypothesized to have greater patient acceptance.

== Comparison to laparoscopic sleeve gastrectomy ==
Laparoscopic sleeve gastrectomy (LSG) is one of the most common bariatric surgeries performed worldwide and shares a similar restricted stomach configuration with the ESG. However, it appears to operate with different weight loss mechanisms from the ESG, as it has been shown to reduce the hunger hormone ghrelin, as well as accelerate, rather than delay, stomach emptying.

Large, prospective studies directly comparing LSG to ESG are lacking. Comparison of the two therapies has relied on retrospective analysis and findings are conflicting. In a recent propensity score-matched study, the difference in weight loss for LSG vs ESG was 9.7% at 1 year, 6.0% at 2 years, and 4.8% at 3 years in favor of LSG, though the authors described the ESG as non-inferior based on an a priori definition of non-inferiority as being within 10% total body weight loss of the surgical arm. Advantages of the ESG over LSG include lack of incisions, shorter length of stay (same-day-discharge vs 3 days in hospital); less gastroesophageal reflux (0-2% vs 15-31%); and lower morbidity and overall adverse event rate (1.9% vs 14.5%), though some studies have presented similar rates of adverse events between ESG and LSG. Despite less weight loss, one study found that patients who had undergone ESG had the same degree of comorbidity resolution and had higher quality of life scores at 6 months compared to those who had undergone LSG.

== See also ==
- Vertical banded gastroplasty surgery
- Intragastric balloon
- Sleeve gastrectomy surgery
- Roux-en-Y gastric bypass surgery
