= VBG =

VBG may refer to:

- Vandenberg Air Force Base, California, USA
- Verkehrsbetriebe Glattal, European bus operator
- Vogtlandbahn, German railway company
- Vertical banded gastroplasty, also known as "stomach stapling"
- Team Vorarlberg, Austrian cycling team
- Volume Bragg grating, a holographic optical element
