= Ileal interposition =

Surgery procedure

- Specialty: Endocrinology

Ileal Interposition is a metabolic surgery procedure, used to treat overweight diabetic patients through surgical means. First presented by the Brazilian surgeon Aureo De Paula in 1999, this technique is applied by placing ileum, which is the distal part of the small intestine, either between stomach and the proximal part of the small intestine or by placing the ileum to the proximal part of the small intestine without touching the natural connections of the stomach. There are two different versions of the operation. Sleeve gastrectomy procedure is standard for both of the versions.

== Diverted (Duodeno-ileal interposition) ==
In addition to sleeve gastrectomy procedure, the connection between the stomach and the duodenum is closed off from the level of the second segment of the duodenum. While preserving the last 30 cm part of the small intestine, a 170 cm segment of ileum is prepared and connected to the first segment of the duodenum, which is at the end of the stomach. The other end of the ileum segment is connected to the proximal part of the small intestine. Thus, distal part of the small intestine is ‘’interposed’’ between proximal part of the small intestine and the stomach. Since duodenum and the proximal part of the small intestine is disabled, a partial bypass is in question. Patients who undergo this operation achieve better weight and blood sugar control, but face anemia (iron deficiency) risk because of the bypass procedure.

== Non-Diverted (Jejuno-ileal interposition) ==
In addition to sleeve gastrectomy procedure, a 200 cm segment of ileum is prepared while preserving the last 30 cm part of the small intestine and then ‘’interposed’’ to the proximal part of the small intestine. Thanks to this, food continue to pass throughout the entire small intestine. No malabsorption is in question in this technique, and the food is absorbed by the duodenum as well. Since negative hormones secreted from the duodenum are quite effective in the surgical treatment of diabetes, this operation offers effective weight control, but has limited effect on blood sugar control.

== Medical uses ==
Type 2 diabetic patients who cannot achieve blood sugar control despite appropriate treatment or suffering from organ damage should consider this operation. This is not a standard treatment for patients with low body mass index, and should only be performed in accordance with certain clinic protocols.

== Physiology ==
1. Increase of GLP-1 levels because of early food contact with ileum mucosa, which in turn regulates early phase insulin secretion (jejuno ileal nutrient sensing)
2. Regulation of late term glucose dependent (20–120 minutes) plasma insulin response because of GIP effect (duodenal exclusion)
3. Decrease of hepatic and peripheral insulin resistance
4. Calorie restriction and weight control dependent on hormonal thermostat mechanism
5. Increased gastric emptying and decreased ghrelin levels
6. Regulation of late phase insufficient glucagon suppression
7. Reduction of increased hepatic glucose output
8. Resolution/control of type 2 diabetes and accompanying co-morbidities

== Complication ==
Complication Rates = 4–6.5%

Mortality Rates: 0.1–0.27%

- Infection: 0.4–0.55%
- Venous Thromboembolism: 0.1–0.27%
- Hemorrhage: 11.8%
- Hernia: Unreported
- Bowel obstruction: 0.3–0.5%

Technical Complications:

- Anastomosis Leak: 1–2.2%
- Narrowness: 1–1.4%
- Ulceration: 0.8–1.2%
- Dumping Syndrome: 0.2–0.4%
- Absorption and Nutrition Disorders: 0.5–1.6%

== Results and benefits ==
Two important advantages and one disadvantage about Ileal Transposition (Interposition) have been reported. First of the advantages is that it can be performed on patients with a broad range of BMI (Body Mass Index), and the other one is that with the exception of patients who already need iron, B12 vitamin and D vitamin supplement prior to the surgery, the operation does not necessitate any additional vitamin supplement. Its disadvantage is that the operation technically quite challenging because it consists of numerous stages and therefore require serious training and technical expertise.

== Costs ==
Longer operation times than other procedures (3–3.5 hours), the need of technologically more advanced equipment and longer hospitalization cause higher costs than other commonly used, simpler procedures with limited effectiveness. The reported costs change between US$15,000–25,000.
