= American Society for Metabolic & Bariatric Surgery =

Organization

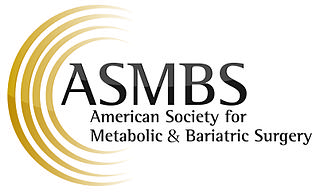
- Founded: 1983
- Founder: Edward Eaton Mason
- Purpose: Obesity
- Location: Gainesville, Florida
- Services: Medical services association; Education and accreditation
- Website: asmbs.org
- Formerly called: American Society for Bariatric Surgery

The American Society for Metabolic & Bariatric Surgery (ASMBS) is a non-profit medical organization dedicated to metabolic and bariatric surgery, and obesity-related diseases and conditions. It was established in 1983.

== Mission ==
The ASMBS, as part of its mission statement, says it is “committed to educating health professionals and the lay public about metabolic and bariatric surgery as an option for the treatment of obesity and morbid obesity and improving the care and treatment of people with obesity and obesity-related diseases and conditions.” This surgical specialty organization says it “encourages its members to investigate and discover new advances in metabolic and bariatric surgery, while maintaining a steady exchange of experiences and ideas that may lead to improved patient outcomes.”

In 2012, the ASMBS had approximately 4,000 members, which includes surgeons, nurses, bariatricians, psychologists, dietitians, and other medical specialists focused on the disease of obesity.

The ASMBS is also an advocate for healthcare policy to promote patient access to high quality prevention and treatment of obesity.

== History ==
The ASMBS was established in 1983. Its founding president was Edward Eaton Mason, MD, a surgeon who is considered the "father" of bariatric or obesity surgery.

On August 15, 2007, the ASBS changed its name to the American Society for Metabolic & Bariatric Surgery (ASMBS) to reflect mounting clinical evidence demonstrating the effectiveness of surgery on metabolic diseases, particularly type 2 diabetes, in addition to its effectiveness on obesity and morbid obesity.

== Programs ==
The ASMBS has held 29 annual scientific meetings. In 2013, the ASMBS and The Obesity Society (TOS) combined their respective annual meetings for "ObesityWeek," which was held from November 11 to November 16, 2013, in Atlanta, Georgia. The scientific and educational conference drew clinicians and scientists from all over the world to review and discuss new data on the full spectrum of the disease of obesity.

In 2006, Centers for Medicare and Medicaid Services (CMS) established a national coverage policy for bariatric/metabolic surgery to help reduce health risks associated with obesity, including death and disability, as long as the procedures were performed at facilities certified by the AMBS or the American College of Surgeons.

In 2012, the ACS and ASMBS announced plans to combine their respective national bariatric surgery accreditation programs into a single unified program to achieve one national accreditation standard for bariatric surgery centers. More than 750 facilities are now enrolled in the program called Metabolic and Bariatric Surgery Accreditation and Quality Improvement Program (MBSAQIP) in the United States.

== Certified Bariatric Nurse (CBN) Program ==
The ASMBS Certified Bariatric Nurse (CBN) program was established in June 2007. Certification indicates nurses have met all testing requirements and have proven to be competent in the care of obese and bariatric surgery patients.
