= Jejunojejunostomy =

- Specialty: Gastroenterology

Jejunojejunostomy is a surgical technique used in an anastomosis between two portions of the jejunum. It is a type of bypass occurring in the intestine. It may lead to marked reduction in the functional volume of the intestine. This technique is also performed using Laparoscopic surgery. The surgical procedure can lead to complications including infections, hemorrhage, strictures, ulcers, intestinal obstruction, thromboembolism and malnutrition.
