= Partial ileal bypass surgery =

- Specialty: Gastroenterology

Partial ileal bypass surgery is a surgical procedure which involves shortening the ileum to shorten the total small intestinal length.

First introduced in 1962 by Professor Henry Buchwald of the University of Minnesota, the procedure is used to treat a number of hyperlipidemias including familial hypercholesterolemia. The only randomized controlled trial comparing bypass surgery with standard management was the POSCH trial, which was conducted by Buchwald and his team. The trial ran between 1975 and 1983 and included 838 men who had survived a heart attack. This trial initially failed to show any benefit on mortality, but in 1998 follow-up results indicated that in addition to its known benefit on cholesterol levels and disease events it had also decreased mortality in the treatment group.

Ileal bypass surgery was mainly performed prior to the introduction of effective oral medication for the most common hypercholesterolemias. It is occasionally used in the surgical treatment of obesity.

As with any ileal resection, a possible complication is mild steatorrhea due to a reduced uptake of bile acids by the ileum.

== See also ==
- Familial hypercholesterolemia
- Ileojejunal bypass
