= Retrocolic hernia =

- Specialty: Gastroenterology

A retrocolic hernia is a medical condition consisting of the entrapment of portions of the small intestine behind the mesocolon. It has been observed to occur as a complication of a left hemicolectomy.
