= Aspiration therapy =

Obesity treatment

Aspiration therapy is a bariatric approach to siphon ingested food from the stomach via an implanted tube and port to the outside of the body to be discarded. The device for this approach was developed by researchers at Washington University in St. Louis to treat obesity and has been named AspireAssist. The device has also been termed a reverse feeding tube. It was approved by the Food and Drug Administration (FDA) on June 14, 2016.

AspireAssist is made by Aspire Bariatrics. It is inserted in an outpatient setting using an endoscope during an about 15 minutes procedure. People with the device can discharge yet undigested food via the port into the toilet, typically 20 to 30 minutes after a meal. Critics have called the approach “assisted bulimia”. In an initial study 18 people those with the device lost more weight than controls. The therapy is supported by a lifestyle counseling program, and requires regular medical supervision.

Candidates for the device cannot have an eating disorder, should be 22 years old or more, and should have a body mass index of 35 to 55. Short-term use is not encouraged. Contraindications for the device are certain eating disorders (i.e. bulimia), certain types of previous abdominal surgery, pregnancy, stomach ulcers and inflammatory bowel disease. Side effects reported are local skin irritation at the port site and abdominal discomfort, nausea, vomiting, constipation, and diarrhea. Local infection may require removal of the tube.

The device is removable. Removal is performed on an outpatient basis and requires about ten minutes.
