= Jejunoileal bypass =

Surgical weight-loss procedure

- ICD-9-CM: 46.93
- MeSH: D007581

Jejunoileal bypass (JIB) was a surgical weight-loss procedure performed for the relief of morbid obesity from the 1950s through the 1970s in which all but 30 cm (12 in) to 45 cm (18 in) of the small bowel were detached and set to the side.

Many complications that followed jejunoileal bypass operations were caused by bacterial overgrowth in the excluded blind loop. The arthritis-dermatitis syndrome was one of the common distressing disorders. The pathogenetic mechanism was thought to be an immune-complex-mediated process related to bypass enteritis.

== Problems ==
Two variants of jejunoileal anastomosis were developed, the end-to-side and end-to end anastomoses of the proximal jejunum to distal ileum. In both instances an extensive length of small intestine was bypassed, not excised, excluding it from the alimentary stream.

In both these variants a total of only about 45 cm (18 in) of normally absorptive small intestine was retained in the absorptive stream, compared with the normal length of approximately 7 metres (20 ft). In consequence, malabsorption of carbohydrate, protein, lipids, minerals and vitamins inevitably occur. Where the end-to-side technique was used, reflux of bowel content back up the defunctionalized small intestine allowed absorption of some of the refluxed material, resulting in less weight loss initially and greater subsequent weight regain.

Bile is secreted by the liver, enters the upper small intestine by way of the bile duct, and is absorbed in the small intestine. Bile has an important role in fat digestion, emulsifying fat as the first stage in its digestion. Bypassing the major site of bile acid reabsorption in the small intestine therefore further reduces fat and fat-soluble vitamin absorption. As a result, huge amounts of fatty acids, which are normally absorbed in the small intestine, enter the colon, where they cause irritation of the colon wall and the secretion of excessive volumes of water and electrolytes, especially sodium and potassium, leading to diarrhea. This diarrhea is the major patient complaint and has characterized jejunoileal bypass in the minds of patient and physician alike since the procedure was introduced.

Bile salts help to keep cholesterol in solution in the bile. Following JIB, the bile salt pool is decreased as a consequence of reduced absorption in the small intestine and bile salt losses in the stool. The relative cholesterol concentration in gallbladder bile rises and cholesterol crystals precipitate in the gallbladder bile, forming a nidus for development of cholesterol gallstones in the gallbladder. Specific vitamin deficiencies also occur; Vitamin D and Calcium deficiencies lead to thinning of bone with bone pain and fractures as a result of osteoporosis and osteomalacia. Bypass of the terminal ileum, which is the specific site of vitamin B_{12} absorption, leads to Vitamin B_{12} deficiency with a specific peripheral neuropathy. Vitamin A deficiency can induce night blindness. Calcium oxalate renal stones occur commonly following JIB, along with increased colonic absorption of oxalate. The colonic absorption of oxalate has been attributed to:

- Exposure of colonic mucosa to excessive bile salts and possibly bile acids, increasing colonic permeability to oxalate, or
- Excessive quantities of fatty acids in the gut form soaps with calcium, reducing its availability to form insoluble calcium oxalate leading to the persistence of soluble and absorbable oxalate in the colon.

Patients with intestinal bypass develop diarrhea 4–6 times daily, the frequency of stooling varying directly with fat intake. There is a general tendency for stooling to diminish with time, as the short segment of small intestine remaining in the alimentary stream increases in size and thickness, developing its capacity to absorb calories and nutrients, thus producing improvement in the patients' nutrition and counterbalancing the ongoing weight loss. This happy result does not occur in every patient, but approximately one-third of those undergoing "intestinal bypass" have a relatively benign course. Unfortunately, even this group is at risk of significant late complications, many patients developing irreversible hepatic cirrhosis several years after the procedure.

== Complications ==
JIB is the classic example of a malabsorptive weight loss procedure. Some modern procedures utilize a lesser degree of malabsorption combined with gastric restriction to induce and maintain weight loss. Any procedure involving malabsorption must be considered at risk to develop at least some of the malabsorptive complications exemplified by JIB. The multiple complications associated with JIB while considerably less severe than those associated with Jejunocolic anastomosis, were sufficiently distressing both to the patient and to the medical attendant to cause the procedure to fall into disrepute.

Listing of jejuno-ileal bypass complications:

Mineral and electrolyte imbalance:

- Decreased serum sodium, potassium, magnesium and bicarbonate
- Decreased sodium chloride
- Osteoporosis and osteomalacia secondary to protein depletion, calcium and vitamin D loss, and acidosis

Protein calorie malnutrition:

- Hair loss, anemia, edema, and vitamin depletion
- Cholelithiasis

Enteric complications:

- Abdominal distension, irregular diarrhea, increased flatus, pneumatosis intestinalis, colonic pseudo-obstruction, bypass enteropathy, volvulus with mechanical small bowel obstruction

Extra-intestinal manifestations:

- Arthritis
- Severe pain issues that are not fully understood
- Liver disease, occurs in at least 30%
- Acute liver failure may occur in the postoperative period, and may lead to death acutely following surgery.
- Steatosis, "alcoholic" type hepatitis, cirrhosis, occurs in 5%, progresses to cirrhosis and death in 1-2%
- Erythema nodosum, non-specific pustular dermatosis
- Weber–Christian disease

Some of these features may coincide in bowel-associated dermatosis-arthritis syndrome.

Renal disease:

- Hyperoxaluria, with oxalate stones or interstitial oxalate deposits, immune complex nephritis, "functional" renal failure.

Miscellaneous:

- Peripheral neuropathy, pericarditis, pleuritis, hemolytic anemia, neutropenia, and thrombocytopenia

The multiple complications associated with JIB led to a search for alternative procedures, one of which was gastric bypass, a procedure that is described in detail later. In 1983 Griffen et al. reported a comprehensive series comparing the results of jejuno-ileal bypass with gastric bypass. 11 of 50 patients who underwent JIB required conversion to gastric bypass within 5 years, leading Griffen to abandon jejuno-ileal bypass.

JIB can be summed up as having: a. Good Weight Loss, b. Malabsorption with multiple deficiencies, c. Diarrhea, d. Severe Pain Issues That are not fully understood, e. Possible Death

As a consequence of all these complications, jejuno-ileal bypass is no longer a recommended bariatric surgical procedure. Indeed, the current recommendation for anyone who has undergone JIB, and still has the operation intact, is to strongly consider having it taken down and converted to one of the gastric restrictive procedures.
