= Surgical Innovation =

Medical journal

- Language: English
- Edited by: Adrian E. Park, MD, FRCS, Lee Swanstrom, MD

Publication details
- History: 1994-present
- Publisher: SAGE Publications
- Frequency: Quarterly
- Impact factor: 1.472 (2018)

Standard abbreviations
- ISO 4: Surg. Innov.

Indexing
- ISSN: 1553-3506
- OCLC no.: 240897558

Links
- Journal homepage; Online access; Online archive

Surgical Innovation is a peer-reviewed academic journal that publishes papers in the field of surgery. Its editors are Adrian E. Park, MD, FRCS (Dalhousie University) and Lee Swanstrom, MD (Legacy Health System). Founded in 1994, it is currently published by SAGE Publications.

== Scope ==
Surgical Innovation focuses on minimally invasive surgical techniques, new instruments and endoscopes, and new technologies. It aims to help surgeons learn new techniques, understand and adapt to new technologies, maintain surgical competencies, and apply surgical outcomes data to their practices.

== Abstracting and indexing ==
The journal is abstracted and indexed in databases including SCOPUS and the Social Sciences Citation Index. According to the Journal Citation Reports, its 2018 impact factor is 1.472, ranking it 131 out of 203 journals in the Surgery category.
