= Sleeve gastrectomy =

Surgical weight-loss procedure involving reduction of stomach size

- Diagram of a gastric sleeve
- ICD-9-CM: 43.89

Sleeve gastrectomy or vertical sleeve gastrectomy, is a surgical weight-loss procedure, typically performed laparoscopically, in which approximately 75 — 85% of the stomach is removed, along the greater curvature, which leaves a cylindrical, or "sleeve"-shaped stomach the size of a banana. Weight loss is affected not only through the reduction of the organ's size, but also by the removal of the portion of it that produces ghrelin, the hormone that stimulates appetite. Patients can lose 50-70 percent of excess weight over the course of the two years that follow the surgery. The procedure is irreversible, though in some uncommon cases, patients can regain the lost weight, via resumption of poor dietary habits, or dilation of the stomach over time, which can require gastric sleeve revision surgery to either repair the sleeve or convert it to another type of weight loss method that may produce better results, such as a gastric bypass or duodenal switch.

A meta-analysis of 174,772 participants published in The Lancet in 2021 found that bariatric surgery was associated with 59% and 30% reduction in all-cause mortality among obese adults with and without type 2 diabetes, respectively. This meta-analysis also found that median life-expectancy was 9.3 years longer for obese adults with diabetes who received bariatric surgery as compared to routine (non-surgical) care, whereas the life expectancy gain was 5.1 years longer for obese adults without diabetes.

== Procedure ==
Sleeve gastrectomy was originally performed as a modification to another bariatric procedure, the duodenal switch, and then later as the first part of a two-stage gastric bypass operation on extremely obese patients for whom the risk of performing gastric bypass surgery was deemed too great. The initial weight loss in these patients was so successful it began to be investigated as a stand-alone procedure.

Sleeve gastrectomy is the most commonly performed bariatric surgery worldwide. In many cases, sleeve gastrectomy is as effective as gastric bypass surgery, including improvements in glucose homeostasis before substantial weight loss has occurred. This weight-loss independent benefit is related to the decrease in gastric volume, changes in gut peptides, and expression of genes involved in glucose absorption.

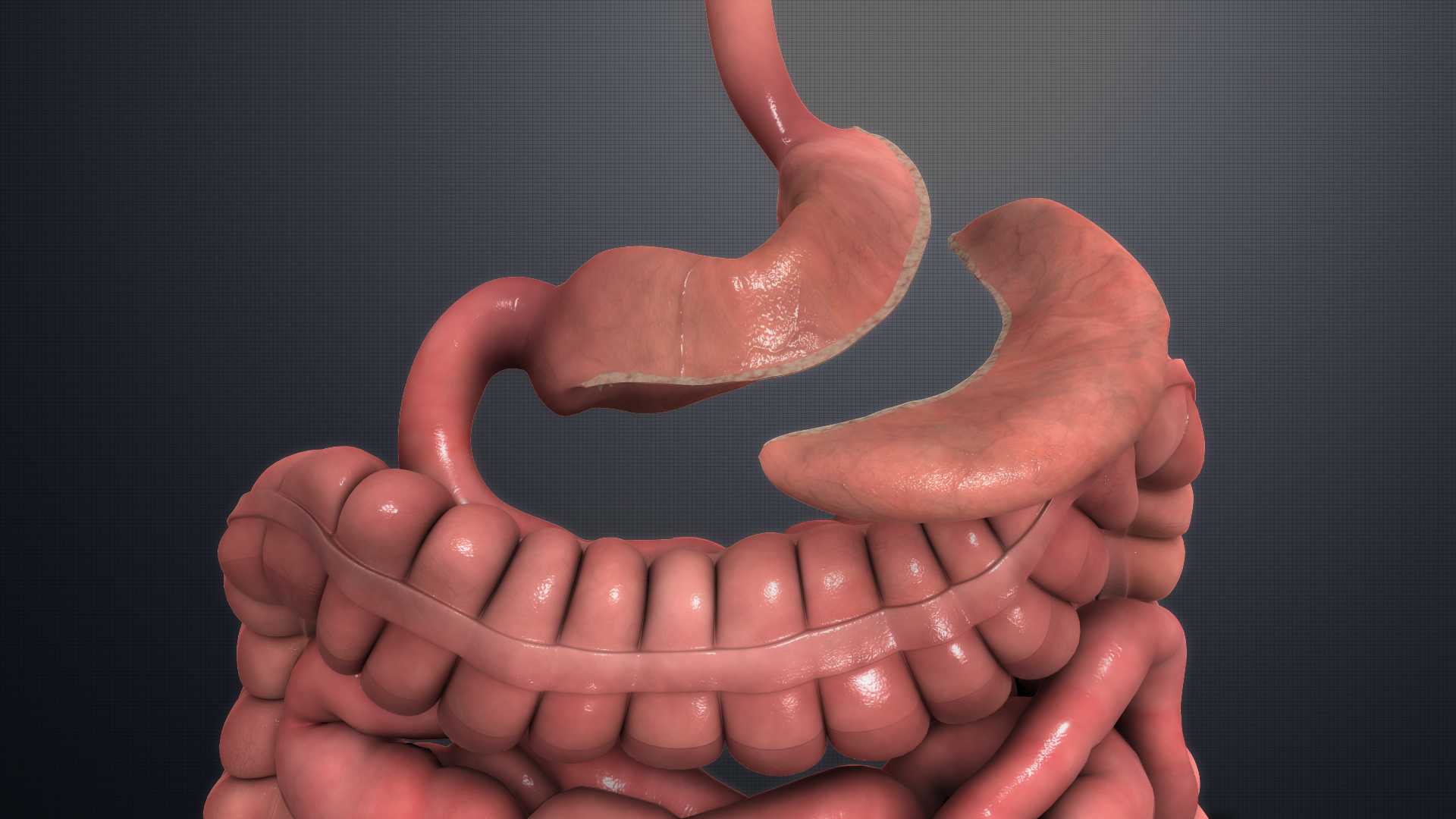
Sleeve gastrectomy surgery

The procedure involves a longitudinal resection of the stomach starting from the antrum at a point 5–6 cm from the pylorus and finishing at the fundus close to the cardia. The remaining gastric sleeve is calibrated with a bougie. Most surgeons prefer to use a bougie between 36 and 40 Fr with the procedure and the ideal approximate remaining size of the stomach after the procedure is about 150 mL.

== Use in children and adolescents ==
Endorsed by the International Federation for the Surgery of Obesity and Metabolic Disorders and the American Society for Metabolic and Bariatric Surgery, sleeve gastrectomy is gaining popularity in children and adolescents. Studies by Alqahtani and colleagues have found that sleeve gastrectomy causes large weight loss in children and adolescents aged 5 to 21 years. Moreover, they compared weight loss with adults and found comparable weight loss. A study published in 2016 showed that growth progresses were unaffected after sleeve gastrectomy in children younger than 14 years of age. Depression following the procedure has been noted in some individuals. Another side effect is insomnia. After this surgery many people can only sleep when they take melatonin or sleeping medications.

== Complications ==
Sleeve gastrectomy may cause complications; some of them are listed below:

- Sleeve leaking (occurs 1 in 200 patients)
- Blood clots (happens 1% of the time)
- Wound infections (occurs in about 10 to 15% of post-op patients)
- Strictures (occurs in 3.5% of post-op patients)
- Aversion to food, and nausea
- Damage to the vagus nerve which will cause constant nausea
- Gastroparesis, with a delay in moving food from the stomach to the small intestine
- Vomiting
- Internal bleeding
- Esophageal spasm/pain
- Gastroesophageal Reflux Disease (GERD)
- Lack of gastric intrinsic factor result in vitamin B_{12} deficiency
- Depression after surgery
- Reduced bone health
- Weight regain
