= Intestinal bypass =

Type of surgery for treating obesity

Intestinal bypass is a bariatric surgery performed on patients with morbid obesity to create an irreversible weight loss when implementing harsh restrictions on the diets has failed. Jejunocolic anastomosis was firstly employed. Nonetheless, it led to some unexpected complications such as severe electrolyte imbalance and liver failure. It was then modified to jejunoileal techniques. Viewed as a novel form of treatment for obesity, many intestinal bypass operations were carried out in the 1960s and 1980s. Significant weight loss was observed in patients, but this surgery also resulted in several complications, for instance, nutritional deficiencies and metabolic problems. Due to the presence of surgical alternatives and anti-obesity medications, intestinal bypass is now rarely used.

== Anatomy of human digestive system ==
In the human digestive system, the stomach is responsible for mechanical and chemical digestions. The small intestine is involved in both the absorption and digestion of nutrients, whereas the large intestine is responsible for the elimination of wastes (defecation). The small intestine consists of 3 parts: duodenum, jejunum and ileum. The duodenum is the first part of the small intestine and is connected to the stomach via the pyloric valve. The jejunum is the second and middle part of the small intestine. The ileum is the last part of the small intestine and is connected to the cecum, a part of the large intestine, via the ileocecal valve.

== Types of intestinal bypass ==
=== Procedures of intestinal bypass surgery ===
The intestinal bypass surgery, as the name suggests, anastomoses 14 inches of the proximal duodenum, the part of the small intestine closest to the stomach, to the 4 inches of the distal ileum, the part of the small intestine closest to large intestines. This creates a blind loop and bypasses nearly 85-90 % of the small intestine. As a corollary, the absorption of nutrients is greatly reduced, and thus lead to apparent weight reduction.

There are four variations of intestinal bypass. They are jejunocolic bypass, end-to-side jejunoileal bypass, end-to-end jejunoileal bypass, and biliopancreatic diversion, respectively.

=== Jejunocolic bypass ===
First performed in 1963, the jejunocolic bypass is regarded as the first type of intestinal bypass surgery. This surgery anastomoses the proximal duodenum to the transverse colon (a part of the large intestine). The surgery, nevertheless, turned out to be a huge failure as patients suffered from severe electrolyte imbalance and metabolic disturbance after it.

=== End-to-side jejunoileal bypass ===
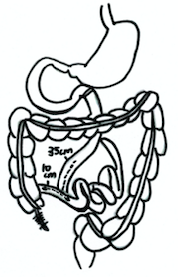
The surgical procedure of end-to-side jejunoileal bypass

This type of surgery was designed to overcome the shortcomings of jejunocolic bypass. First performed in 1969, it anastomoses the end of the proximal duodenum to the side of the distal ileum. However, owing to the possibility of reflux of ileal content to the blind loop, some surgeons doubted the effectiveness of this surgery.

=== End-to-end jejunoileal bypass ===
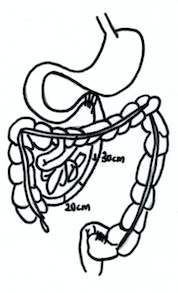
The surgical procedure of end-to-end jejunoileal bypass

This type of surgery appeared at the same time as end-to-side jejunoileal bypass. Some surgeons regarded this as a better option than end-to-side jejunoileal bypass because it prevented the reflux of ileal content to the blind loop. In order to achieve this, the end of the proximal duodenum is anastomosed to the distal ileum. The blind loop is drained to the transverse colon. However, two studies revealed that both end-to-side and end-to-end jejunoileal bypass had similar weight loss effect.

=== Biliopancreatic diversion ===
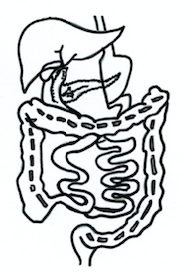
The surgical procedure of biliopancreatic diversion

First appeared in 1980, biliopancreatic diversion involves two parts: gastrectomy and intestinal bypass. Firstly, gastrectomy removes a large portion of the stomach. Reduction in stomach capacity decreases the appetite of patients. Secondly, intestinal bypass anastomoses the proximal duodenum and the distal ileum. This intestinal bypass is different from the above three bypasses in the way that the blind loop carrying bile and digestive enzymes will drain into the distal portion of the small intestine. With this technique, the absorption of nutrients, in particular, fat, can be reduced tremendously.

== Mechanisms of weight reduction ==
This surgery acts in the following ways to help patients reduce their body weight:

=== Induction of malabsorption ===
Induction of malabsorption is the most prominent effect of the surgery. The small intestines are responsible for most of the absorption of nutrients. By bypassing a considerable length of the small intestines, this type of surgery greatly reduces the absorption capacity of the digestive system. Malabsorption is especially prominent in biliopancreatic diversion. Not only does it reduce the length of the small intestine for absorption, but it also drains the bile and digestive enzymes only to the distal ileum. Bile is essential for fat absorption, while digestive enzymes facilitate the intake of proteins. Draining them to only the distal ileum further reduces the efficiency of intestinal absorption, hence achieving the goal of weight reduction.

=== Conditioning of appetite ===
If the patients take excessive food after the surgery, they will experience abdominal discomforts such as steatorrhea and abdominal pain, as patients' digestive system capacity has been reduced drastically.

== Selection Criteria ==
Intestinal bypass, in spite of its highly effectiveness in weight reduction, is a risky and irreversible. Thus, it requires rigorous assessment and selection before the surgery is carried out. The following are the normal selection criteria:

- Overweight for more than 100 lbs.
- Readiness to accept the side effects and hence all the follow-up procedures.
- Evidence of failure in all previous attempts in weight reduction.
- Stable mental health status.
- Psychiatric evaluation showing the obese state.
- An absence of all types of endocrinopathies that are correctable.

This surgery serves as the LAST approach to lose weight when all other weight-losing methods have failed and at the same time, morbid obesity remains a life-threatening problem. It is crucial for patients to understand all the pros and cons of this surgery, despite the weight loss they aimed for.

== Health impacts ==
Intestinal bypass surgery can lead to loss of weight effectively, but it can also lead to various complications that should not be neglected. About half of the patients who received this surgery need rehospitalization to manage the complications. The expected outcomes and possible risks of the intestinal bypass surgery are shown as follows:

=== Expected surgical outcomes ===
==== Weight loss ====
It is estimated that the absorptive surface area in the small intestine can be reduced by 85% after the surgery. This results in continuous malabsorption, and thus sustainable weight loss.

==== Metabolic benefits ====
- Blood glucose level is significantly reduced. In patients with hyperglycaemia, a normal blood glucose level and a significant decline of insulin resistance are observed after the surgery, except for the cases of patients with type I diabetes.
- Serum cholesterol and lipid levels decrease, which lower the risks of developing cardiovascular diseases such as atherosclerosis.

=== Risks of the intestinal bypass ===
==== Adverse metabolic effects ====
- Diarrhoea is observed in almost all patients undertaking this surgery. The daily frequency of defecations can be up to 20. This will usually affect the patients for three to six months. Electrolyte imbalance is very likely to occur owing to diarrhoea. Low serum levels of potassium, magnesium and zinc were reported.
- Metabolic bone disease is more likely to occur in patients with Vitamin D deficiency before the surgery. A few cases of osteomalacia were reported.

==== Physical weakness ====
Fatigue is common after the surgery due to the malabsorption of nutrients.

==== Complications ====
- Kidney stone is also an associated risk of the intestinal bypass surgery. This is mainly due to enteric hyperoxaluria. Increased absorption of oxalate in colons rises the risk of the formation of kidney stones.
- Arthritis may appear after the surgery in morbid obesity patients due to excessive immune responses to the gut bacteria. The symptoms can last for three to six months. However, symptoms of arthritis are not severe.

==== Dysfunctions in GI tracts ====
Flatulence is observed even after years of surgery. Patients may suffer from persistent problems of producing flatus with foul-smell due to the accumulation of gas in the gastrointestinal tract. There can also be problems of abnormal distension of the abdomen after meals.

==== Long-term health issues ====
Long-term negative health effects were reported. Chronic diarrhoea is a common and frequent complication, and further leading to higher risk of proctologic diseases such as haemorrhoids. More seriously, the risks of developing nephrolithiasis and chronic kidney disease are 28.7% and 9.0% respectively in the long term.

== Nutritional deficiencies and solutions ==
Nutritional deficiencies are often seen in patients after the surgery due to malabsorption. They include:

=== Loss of appetite ===
Anorexia is considered to be a normal response found after the first few weeks of the surgery but after four to six weeks, most patients gain back their initial appetite before receiving the surgery.

=== Electrolyte imbalance ===
- Hypokalaemia is also considered to be a normal response after the intestinal bypass surgery. Without the supply of potassium supplements, hypokalaemia is seen in almost all patients. Therefore, patients are usually prescribed with six months of tablet or liquid form of potassium supplements postoperatively.
- Hypocalcaemia is also observed in some patients. Symptoms resulting from this electrolyte imbalance include anxiety, muscle cramping and paraesthesia. Calcium supplements are administered to patients when serum calcium levels are lower than normal.

=== Lack of vitamins ===
Low serum levels of Vitamin B12, Vitamin A, Vitamin D, Vitamin E, and Vitamin K are common nutritional deficiencies after the surgery. 1000 mg of Vitamin B12 is recommended monthly, and supplements of vitamins and minerals are also recommended for the first half to full year after the surgery until the rapid weight loss period has passed.

=== Damages to organs ===
Hepatic damage results from the inadequacy in nutritional supply and steatosis, where it remains as the most serious, and possibly lethal, side effect. Patients may show symptoms like nausea and emesis. Intake of alcohol is intolerable as it increases the tendency for the liver to become impaired. Incidents of death due to liver failure have also been reported. By applying amino acid replacement orally right after the surgery, prevention of these liver problems may be achieved.

== Alternatives to intestinal bypass ==
=== Alternative surgical treatments ===
Due to the aforementioned complications, instead of performing the intestinal bypass surgery, gastric bypass surgery is a more commonly used bariatric surgery nowadays. Intestinal bypass surgery induces malabsorption by anastomosing proximal and distal small intestine. Yet, the small intestine has an important role in performing a wide range of important physiological and metabolic functions, such as the metabolism of lipids. Stomach, on the contrary, has a less significant role in the physiological and metabolic functions. The most prominent physiological function of the stomach is digestion, but the small intestine is also capable of digestion. Thus, gastric bypass surgery does less harm to the overall metabolism of nutrients. Gastric bypass leads to weight loss by controlling the appetite of the patients, instead of inducing malabsorption. As a result, the intestinal bypass is now replaced by an alternative of gastric bypass.

=== Anti-obesity medications ===
Anti-obesity medications is also a possible solution. Examples of such medications include the Orlistat, which was first prescribed in 1998. In 2009, it became an over-the-counter drug after obtaining consent from the European Medicines Agency. In clinical trials, patients prescribed with Orlistat (120 mg) showed better weight loss than those without (8.76 kg vs 5.81 kg) in one year. With effective medications, the obese can better control their weight without the need of undergoing a relatively high-risk surgery.

== See also ==
- Bariatric surgery
- Obesity
- Human digestive system
