= Gastric balloon =

Inflatable medical device

- A diagram of a gastric balloon.
- Other names: Stomach balloon, intragastric balloon

A gastric balloon, also known as an intragastric balloon (IGB) or a stomach balloon, is an inflatable medical device that is temporarily placed into the stomach to help reduce weight. It is designed to help provide weight loss when diet and exercise have failed and surgery is not wanted by or recommended for the patient.

== Medical uses ==
Intragastric balloons are an alternative to bariatric surgery (or weight loss surgery), which is not generally offered to patients with a body mass index of less than 35. Gastric balloons are also designed for patients who require weight-loss support but who do not want to commit to surgical interventions.

Intragastric balloons help induce weight loss by increasing satiety, delaying gastric emptying, and reducing the amount of food eaten at each meal. Gastric balloons take up space in the stomach, which limits the amount of food that can be held. This creates an early feeling of fullness and satiety. A reduced intake of food then results in weight loss.

== Endoscopic Intragastric Balloons ==
Most balloons require endoscopy for removal or placement. They are usually placed for up to six months, though some devices are placed for twelve months. The device is then removed, again using endoscopy. Longer placement is not advised because of the danger of damage to the tissue wall and degradation of the balloon. The use of the balloon is complemented with counseling and nutritional support or advice.

Endoscopic placement of the balloon is temporary and reversible without surgical incisions. The gastric balloon for weight loss differs from the Sengstaken-Blakemore balloon used to stop esophageal and gastric bleeding.

== Non-Endoscopic Intragastric Balloons ==
Gastric balloon uptake has until recently been limited due to the need for endoscopy for placement or removal.

Procedureless, or non-endoscopic, intragastric balloons offer a promising alternative to historic endoscopic balloons. Non-endoscopic balloons are also a less invasive alternative to weight-loss surgery.

In 2015, Allurion's Elipse gastric balloon became the world's first non-endoscopic swallowable gastric balloon when it gained approval in Europe. Except under exceptional circumstances, it does not require endoscopy or surgery for placement or removal. The non-endoscopic gastric balloon capsule is swallowed for placement and once in the stomach is filled with saline liquid. After 16 weeks, the non-endoscopic gastric balloon then automatically deflates and passes naturally at the end of placement. A recent meta analysis of 6 studies found the balloon was a safe device offering effective weight loss. Total pooled weight loss at the completion of treatment (4–6 months) was 12.8% and at 12 months was 10.9%.

== Adjustable Intragastric Balloons ==
Adjustable gastric balloons are able to increase or decrease their volume. While non-adjustable gastric balloons have been successfully used for weight loss for the last 30 years, the adjustability function was developed to address the following issues: (1) variability of response and reduced efficacy after 3 months and (2) intolerance necessitating early balloon extraction. Alleviating intolerance with a downward adjustment and renewing weight loss after balloon upward adjustment, are responsible for higher success rates compared with non-adjustable balloons. The Spatz3 adjustable gastric balloon is the first intragastric balloon approved for 1-year implantation (outside of the US), while featuring an adjustability function that provides balloon volume changes as needed.

== Results ==
The device is intended to be used by people with a body mass index of more than 27 kg/m^{2}. or between 30 and 40 kg/m^{2} and have weight-related co-morbidity. It should not be applied to patients with certain intestinal problems such as inflammatory bowel disease or delayed gastric emptying, who are pregnant, or who are taking blood thinner medications such as Coumadin. Low dose aspirin (100 mg) is permitted.

A 2016 meta analysis of studies showed short term weight loss without any mortality. It was calculated that the weight loss was 1.59 and 1.34 kg/m^{2} for overall and 3-month body mass index (BMI) loss, respectively, and 4.6 and 4.77 kg for overall and 3-month weight loss, respectively.

Results are influenced by the adherence to nutritional and dietary programs. Long-term studies show promise for patients who combine balloon treatment with exercise and a healthy diet. In a study on the 'Long-Term Efficacy of the Elipse Gastric Balloon System: An International Multicenter Study, Dr. Roberta Ienca and colleagues' report on 509 patients who received the non-endoscopic Elipse balloon and were followed for one year. After 4 months of treatment, patients achieved weight loss of 14.4 kg or 13.9% of total body weight. At one-year follow-up, 95% of this weight loss was maintained by patients included in the study.

== Safety and side effects ==
Gastric balloons are generally considered to be safe and effective in the short term. Existing clinical data shows an acceptable safety profile. One of the largest intragastric balloon studies ever performed, which included 1770 patients, demonstrated an excellent safety profile.

There can be procedure-related side effects due to endoscopy and anesthesia on balloons that require medical intervention for placement or removal. On very rare occasions, the endoscopic placement of a balloon has led to death.

Several studies have demonstrated that the data on both the efficacy and safety for the non-endoscopic Allurion Elipse gastric balloon compares favorably with balloons that require endoscopy. It showed an acceptable safety profile with 0.2% of serious adverse events, which is comparable to the Orbera balloon, which requires endoscopy.

Post-placement side effects of gastric balloons are common and may include nausea, vomiting, reflux and stomach cramps. Other side effects include indigestion, bloating, flatulence and diarrhea. Rare side effects include esophagitis, gastric ulcer formation or gastric perforation. The device can become deflated and slip into the lower intestines. Migration of a balloon can lead to bowel obstruction.

== Mechanism ==
Currently, there are three types of FDA-approved gastric balloons in the USA. These approved devices are placed via the esophagus using endoscopy. This can be done in an outpatient setting under sedation. One further balloon, Allurion's Ellipse, has European CE approval and does not require endoscopy for placement or removal.

Once in place the balloon is filled with saline and remains as a free-floating object in the stomach cavity, too big to pass through the pylorus. In addition to saline, the balloon that is made from silicone may contain some radio-opaque material as a radiographic marker and a dye such as methylene blue to alert the patient if the balloon leaks. Studies have suggested that fluid is superior to air for distending gastric balloons. Inflated balloons reduce the operative volume capacity of the stomach. While the typical gastric volume is about 900 ml, an inflated balloon may take up most of the space, about 700 (+/-100) ml.

== Availability and costs ==
Gastric balloon-type devices have been approved in many countries, among them Australia, Canada, Mexico, India, Guatemala and several European and South American countries. They became available in the United States in 2015 when two different balloon devices were approved by the FDA.

- ReShape Integrated Dual Balloon System (ReShape Dual Balloon) is a double balloon device. The double balloon system is supposed to provide a level of safety: when one balloon leaks or ruptures, blue dye in the urine will alert the patient that there is a problem.
- Orbera consists of a single balloon device. It has been shown to reduce weight when combined with exercise and diet over six months.
- The Obalon balloon system may consist of one, two or three balloon devices. This balloon is swallowed for placement but requires endoscopy for removal.
- Europe has given the CE mark to Allurion Elipse gastric balloon, which is the only gastric balloon that does not need an endoscopic procedure for either placement or removal. It is swallowed for placement and passes naturally after around 16 weeks. It is offered as part of a combined package with a healthy lifestyle plan that includes nutritional advice.

Costs for the gastric balloon are surgeon-specific and vary by region. Average cost in the US is US$8,150, and generally less in other countries. Average cost in Europe is around €3,000. Insurance coverage is usually not provided in the US. There are three cost categories for the intragastric balloon: pre-operative (e.g. professional fees, lab work and testing), the procedure itself (e.g. surgeon, surgical assistant, anesthesia and hospital fees) and post-operative (e.g. follow-up physician office visits, vitamins and supplements).

== History ==
The first person to use a gastric balloon for the treatment of obesity was A. Henning 1979. (Inn. Med.6(1979),149) He and his wife used it in a self-experiment.

The use of gastric filling devices to induce weight loss is not new. DeBakey's review in 1938 showed that bezoars led to weight loss. Free floating intragastric balloons were used by Nieben and Harboe in 1982. Percival presented a “balloon diet” in 1984 when he placed inflated mammary implants as gastric balloons. Elipse mide Balonu In 1985 the Garren-Edwards Bubble was introduced as the first FDA-approved device, but the approval was withdrawn seven years later because of complications. Analysis of its problems led to recommendations for safer designs. While a number of further developed devices were used outside of the US, mostly in Europe and South America, the FDA did not approve any new devices until 2015. In October 2017, ReShape Medical, which makes gastric balloons, was acquired by EnteroMedics in $38m cash-and-stock deal.
