= Ileojejunal bypass =

Surgical procedure

The ileojejunal bypass is an experimental surgery designed as a remedy for morbid obesity.

It was first performed on a series of patients at White Memorial Hospital, Los Angeles, California, in the mid-to-late 1970s. It has since been discarded, as the complications from the surgery, including malnutrition, vitamin deficiencies, protein and albumin deficiency, liver and renal failure, and kidney stones, highly outweighed the benefits. Many patients who received this surgery consequently underwent reversal surgery.
