= Roux-en-Y anastomosis =

Type of surgery

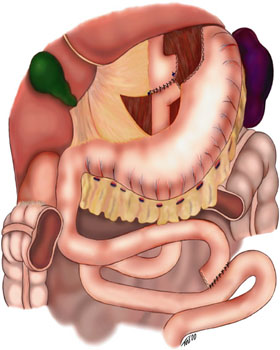
- Schematic of gastric bypass using a Roux-en-Y anastomosis. The transverse colon is not shown so that the Roux-en-Y can be clearly seen. The variant seen in this image is retrocolic, retrogastric, because the distal small bowel that joins the proximal segment of stomach is behind the transverse colon and stomach.
- Other names: Roux-en-Y

In general surgery, a Roux-en-Y anastomosis, or Roux-en-Y, is an end-to-side surgical anastomosis of bowel used to reconstruct the gastrointestinal tract. Typically, it is between stomach and small bowel that is distal (or further down the gastrointestinal tract) from the cut end.

== Overview ==
The name is derived from the surgeon who first described it (César Roux) and the stick-figure representation. Diagrammatically, the Roux-en-Y anastomosis looks a little like the letter Y.

Typically, the two upper limbs of the Y represent (1) the proximal segment of stomach and the distal small bowel it joins with and (2) the blind end that is surgically divided off, and the lower part of the Y is formed by the distal small bowel beyond the anastomosis.

Roux-en-Ys are used in several operations and collectively called Roux operations.

When describing the surgery, the Roux limb is the efferent or antegrade limb that serves as the primary recipient of food after the surgery, while the hepatobiliary or afferent limb that anastomoses with the biliary system serves as the recipient for biliary secretions, which then travel through the excluded small bowel to the distal anastomosis at the mid jejunum to aid digestion. The altered anatomy can contribute to indigestion following surgery. The procedure has also been associated with an increased incidence of iron-deficiency anemia. Iron-deficiency anemia develops in up to 45% of people who have had a Roux-en-Y anastomosis.

== Operations that make use of a Roux-en-Y ==
- Some gastric bypasses for obesity.
- Multiple failed Nissen fundoplication surgeries.
- Roux-en-Y reconstruction following partial or complete gastrectomy for stomach cancer.
- Roux-en-Y hepaticojejunostomy used to treat (macroscopic) bile duct obstruction which may arise due to:
  - a common bile duct tumour or hepatic duct tumour (e.g. resection of cholangiocarcinoma)
  - a bile duct injury (e.g. cholecystectomy, iatrogenic, trauma)
  - an infection/inflammation (e.g. pancreatic pseudocyst)
- Roux-en-Y choledochojejunostomy – indications same as Roux-en-Y hepaticojejunostomy.
- Roux-en-Y pancreas transplant
- Roux-en-Y pancreas reconstruction after blunt abdominal trauma.
- Roux-en-Y hepaticojejunostomy or choledochojejunostomy with gastrojejunostomy as palliation for irresectable pancreatic head cancer.
