= Vertical banded gastroplasty surgery =

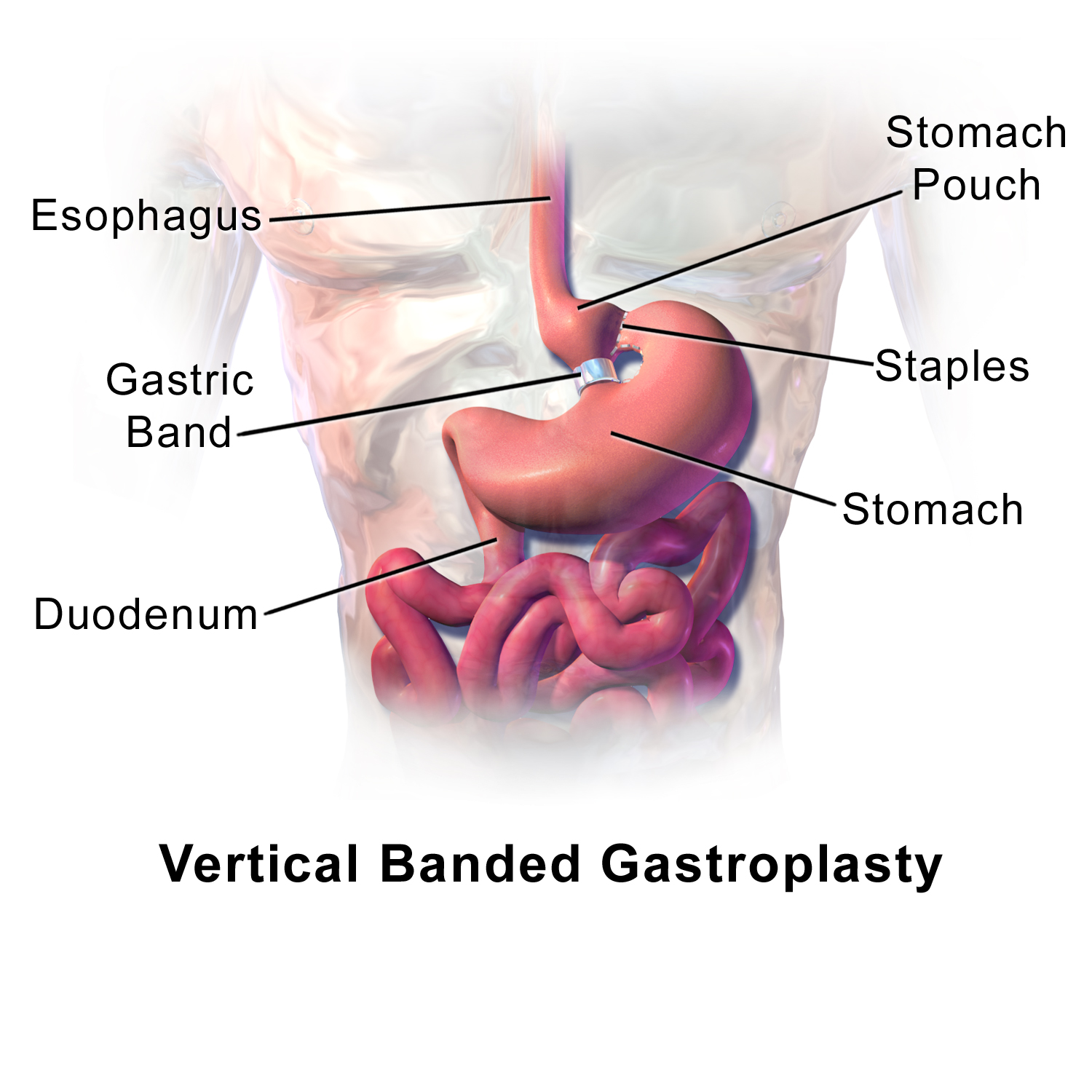
- Illustration depicting vertical banded gastroplasty
- Other names: Stomach stapling
- ICD-9-CM: 44.68

Vertical banded gastroplasty (VBG), also known as stomach stapling, is a form of bariatric surgery for weight control. The VBG procedure involves using a band and staples to create a small stomach pouch. In the bottom of the pouch is an approximate one-centimeter hole through which the pouch contents can flow into the remainder of the stomach and hence on to the remainder of the gastrointestinal tract.

Stomach stapling is a restrictive technique for managing obesity. The pouch limits the amount of food a patient can eat at one time and slows passage of the food. Stomach stapling is more effective when combined with a malabsorptive technique, in which part of the digestive tract is bypassed, reducing the absorption of calories and nutrients. Combined restrictive and malabsorptive techniques are called gastric bypass techniques, of which Roux-en-Y gastric bypass surgery (RGB) is the most common. In this technique, staples are used to form a pouch that is connected to the small intestine, bypassing the lower stomach, the duodenum, and the first portion of the jejunum.

This type of weight loss surgery is losing favor as more doctors begin using the adjustable gastric band. The newer adjustable band does not require cutting into the stomach and does not use any staple lines, thus making it a much safer alternative.

== Advantages and disadvantages ==
=== Advantages ===
- No dumping syndrome.
- No nutritional deficiencies/malabsorption.

=== Disadvantages ===
- Needs strict patient compliance to diet.
- High-fiber foods and foods with a more dense, natural consistency can become very difficult to eat, while highly refined foods cause little discomfort. Many people who regain any weight lost after surgery do so because they begin to avoid the discomfort associated with consuming "healthier" foods, and start eating more easily passed "junk" foods.
- VBG is in no way a magic bullet or pill. It must be emphasized that lifestyle changes, e.g., diet and exercise, are absolutely imperative for weight loss to occur and be maintained. Realistic expectations are imperative.
- Reversal of a VBG requires a much more complex and intensive surgical process than getting the VBG. When removal of a polyurethane band is involved (polyurethane was predominantly used in the 1980s and 90s), it likely has built substantial scar tissue that must also be removed, depending on how long since the VBG took place. Removal of the staples involves stitching back together the previously separated parts of the stomach. For these reasons, a reversal should be considered only if there are serious medical complications.
- Vomiting and severe discomfort if food is not properly chewed or if food is eaten too quickly.
- Not adjustable (as with the adjustable gastric band, a.k.a. "lap band")).

=== Alternatives ===
- Duodenal switch surgery
- Vertical sleeve gastrectomy
- Roux-en-Y gastric bypass
- Selective vagotomy (snipping the vagus nerve, effectively stopping hunger sensations).
- Mini gastric bypass

== Long term ==
Although restrictive operations lead to weight loss in almost all patients, they are less successful than malabsorptive operations in achieving substantial, long-term weight loss. About 30% of those who undergo VBG achieve normal weight, and about 80% achieve some degree of weight loss. Most studies have suggested that 10 years after surgery, only 10% of patients maintain a minimum weight loss of at least 50% of their total excess weight at the time of their initial surgery. Some patients regain weight. Others are unable to adjust their eating habits and fail to lose the desired weight. Successful results depend on the patient's willingness to adopt a long-term plan of healthy eating and regular physical activity. According to an episode of Oprah Winfrey that aired on October 24, 2006, 30% of people who undergo weight-loss surgery such as VBG or gastric bypass develop addiction transference, which is transferring the previous addiction to food with a new addiction to alcoholism. The show stressed the importance of examining the root causes of addiction in order to avoid the phenomenon.

== Complications ==
- Staple-line disruption
- Stomal fibrosis
- Gastroesophageal reflux disease
- Incisional ventral hernia

== History ==
Vertical banded gastroplasty was developed in 1980 by Dr. Edward E. Mason at the University of Iowa. Dr. Mason also developed the original gastric bypass for weight reduction in 1966 and is known for his pioneering work as the "father of obesity surgery".

== See also ==
- Endoscopic sleeve gastroplasty
