= Sharon High School =

Location
- 181 Pond Street; Sharon, Massachusetts 02067; United States; 42.114444°N 71.178333°W

Information
- Type: Public
- Motto: Eagle Pride
- School district: Sharon Public Schools
- Superintendent: Peter Botelho
- Principal: Kristen Keenan
- Teaching staff: 102. 22(FTE)
- Grades: 9–12
- Student to teacher ratio: 11.07
- Campus: Suburban
- Color
- Athletics: Division 2
- Athletics conference: Hockomock League
- Mascot: Eagle
- Team name: Eagles
- Rival: Walpole
- Accreditation: NEASC
- National ranking: 374
- Newspaper: The Talon
- Yearbook: The Marsengold
- YouTube Channel: Sharon High Eagle TV's channel on YouTube
- Website: hs.sharonschools.net

Sharon High School (SHS) is a public high school serving the residents of the town of Sharon, Massachusetts, United States. It serves grades 9 to 12, and is a part of Sharon Public Schools district. The building is located at 181 Pond Street, less than a mile away from the town center.

The student body is 52 percent male and 47 percent female, and the total minority enrollment is 39.6 percent. In 2011, Sharon High School received a National Blue Ribbon Schools award by the U.S. Department of Education. Students have the opportunity to take Advanced Placement (AP) coursework and exams. The AP participation rate at Sharon High School is 62 percent.

== History ==
The old Sharon High School building was originally constructed in 1956, to replace the Charles R. Wilber School, which served as the town's high school before 1957. The high school grounds includes a track and field complex to the southeast, baseball field, softball field and five tennis courts to the south.

In 2013, SMMA was commissioned for an existing commissions study on the building to determine the capital needs of the building. The report highlighted many deficiencies and concerns. The building did not meet the requirements of the Massachusetts School Building Authority (MSBA) such as the small sizes of classrooms. The report also highlighted structural concerns that did not comply with the Americans with Disabilities Act, which the district was fined numerous times for as the result. In addition, the building had insufficient space, poor & damaged building conditions and aging mechanical & electrical. These problems results in teachers having to roll supplies and change classrooms, students having to eat lunch in the hallways, wheelchairs not able to access certain parts of the building, water being allowed into the building due to cracks in the walls, cafeteria refrigerators having to be located outside and winter sports having to be done inside and in the hallways.

=== New high school building ===
In the spring of 2016, the Sharon Public Schools district submitted a statement of interest to the MSBA to secure state funding to renovate the existing building or build a new high school building. In February 2017, the MSBA accepted the district's statement of interest, making them eligible for the 2017 eligibility period, a 270-day timeframe to secure public support in order to enter a feasibility study. The district gathered support from town meetings.

On November 4, 2020, Sharon Town Meeting voters met in the high school auditorium and voted in favor of a $163 million proposal to build a new high school, with 1,137 votes in favor, 134 against. On November 19, 2020, a town election to fund the new high school passed with a simple majority, giving the go ahead to build the new high school.

The building was designed by Tappé Architects. The new building was built on the existing baseball/softball fields, south of the old building. The building includes 42 academic classrooms, 12 science labs, an indoor track, a two-tiered auditorium, among other purpose-built rooms.

In the summer of 2020, construction started on the new high school on the existing baseball field, softball field and tennis courts south of the old building. The building opened to students in the fall of 2022 and its outdoor facilities were fully completed by August 2023. The track and field complex from the previous building was maintained.

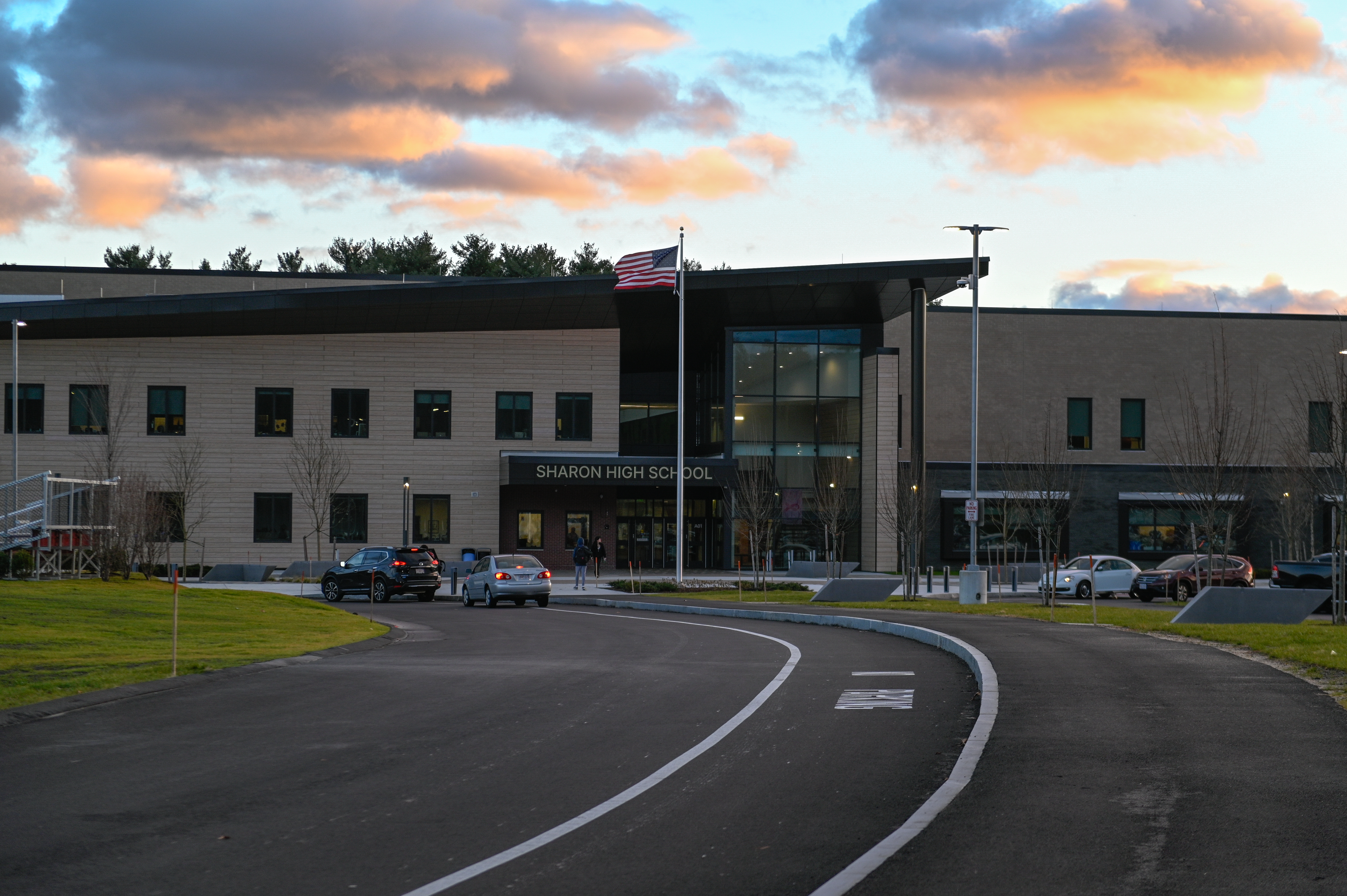
Sharon High School Campus

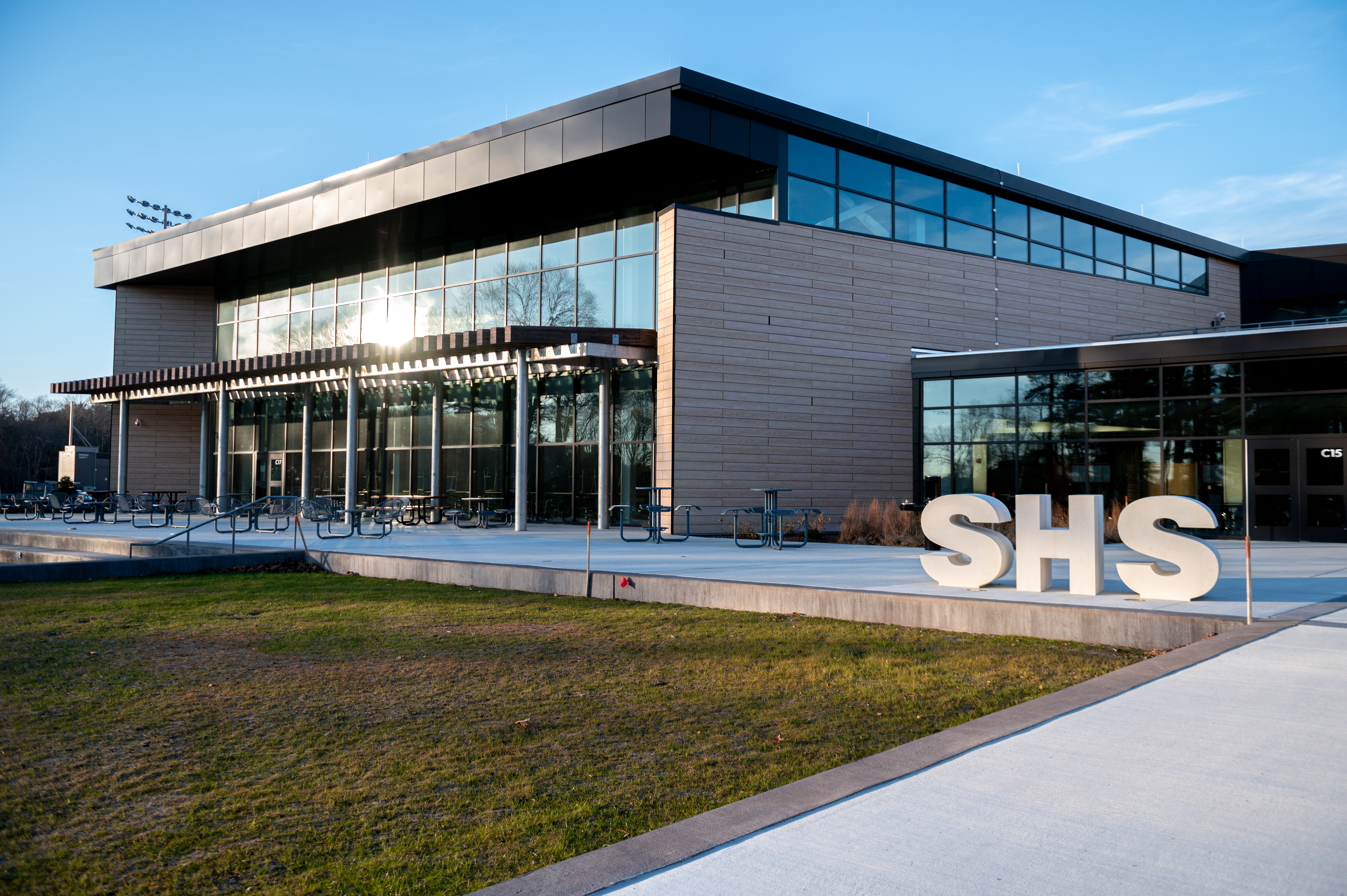
New Sharon High School building in November 2023

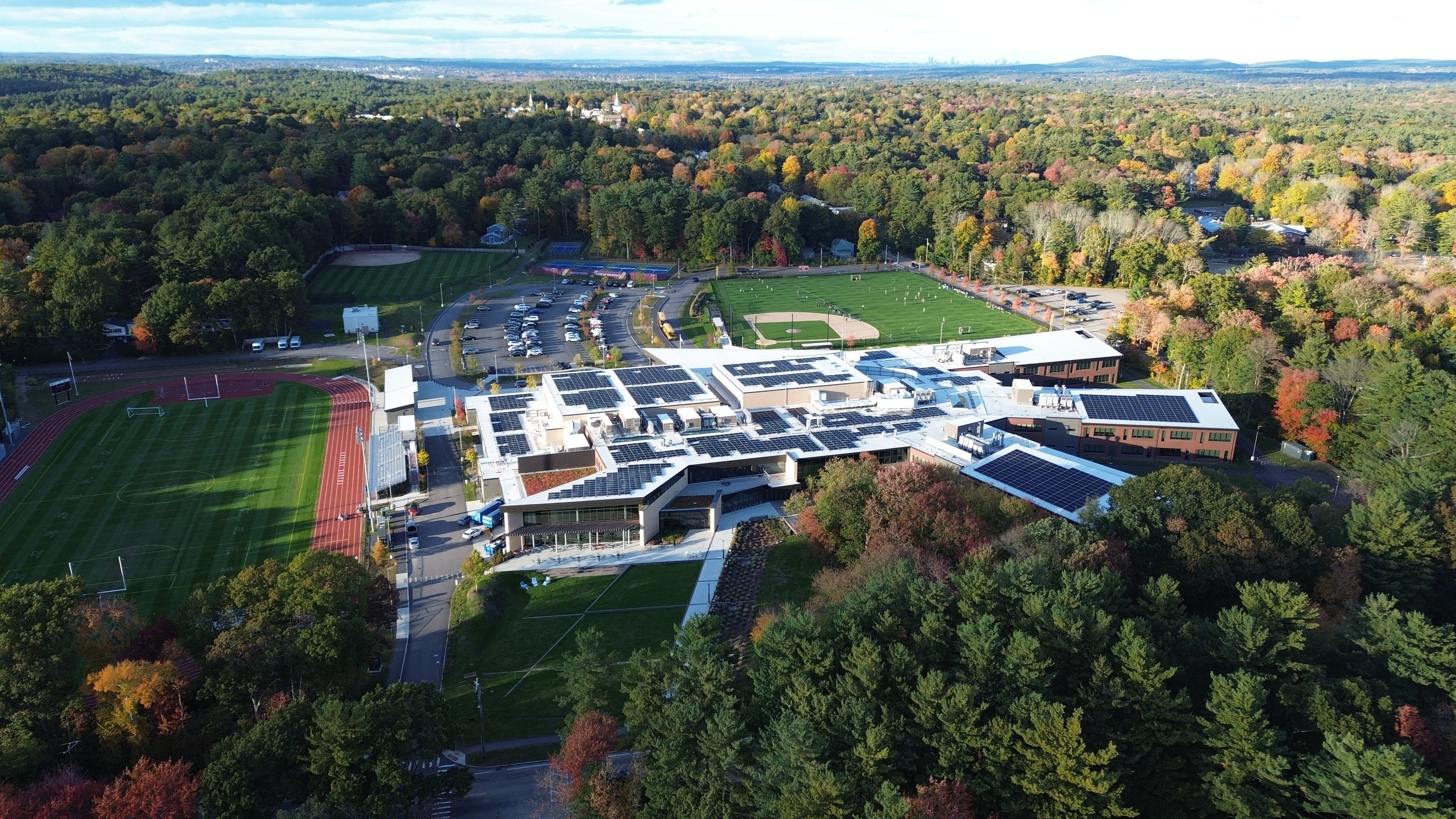
Aerial view of Sharon High school campus (Fall 2024)

== Sports ==
Sharon High School is a member of the Hockomock League and part of the Davenport Division. They are known for their successful tennis and gymnastics programs. The men's tennis team has won 44 league titles dating back to 1971 and won 38 straight titles between 1980 and 2018. From May 2010 to May 2018, they won 123 straight matches against opponents in the Hockomock League. They have also won 7 state championships since the program's inception. The woman's tennis team has won 21 league titles overall, the most in the Hockomock League. The gymnastics team has won more league titles than any other team in the Hockomock League, with 18 total.

The Sharon High football team won the school's first-ever state championship on December 1, 2012, defeating Wayland, 12–3, in the Eastern Massachusetts Division III Super Bowl at Bentley University. Head Coach Dave Morse was named the New England Patriots High School Coach of the Year, and senior captain and middle linebacker Brad Schiff, who recorded the game-sealing interception in the fourth quarter, was named to numerous All-State teams.

== Extracurriculars ==
Sharon High School offers over 130 extracurricular programs, including a competitive DECA team, Mock Trial, two student government organizations, Model UN, Science Olympiad, CyberPatriot, Quiz Bowl, and Debate. The Sharon Math and Science Tournament was the first regional dual science and math tournament for middle schoolers, which began at Sharon High in 2014. Sharon also has a successful Mock Trial team, winning Massachusetts state championships in 2007 and 2021, coming second in 2009, and qualifying for the state semifinals in 2025 and 2026. They have appeared in the state tournament almost every year since the club's inception at Sharon High School.

== Notable alumni ==
- John Brebbia (did not graduate), professional baseball player
- Louis Kafka (1964), former politician
- Bill Keating (1970), Member of Congress
- Bruce Pearl (1978), college basketball coach
- Aaron Schatz (1992), ESPN NFL analyst
- Adam Cheyer (1984), co-founder of Siri and Change.org
- Kenneth Marcus (1984), attorney and founder of the Brandeis Center
- Steve Davis (1997), business executive and former administrator of DOGE
- Ted Philips (2001), politician
- Jake Fishman (2013), American-Israeli Miami Marlins and Team Israel baseball player
