= Kenneth L. Marcus =

American attorney, academic, and government official

Kenneth Marcus
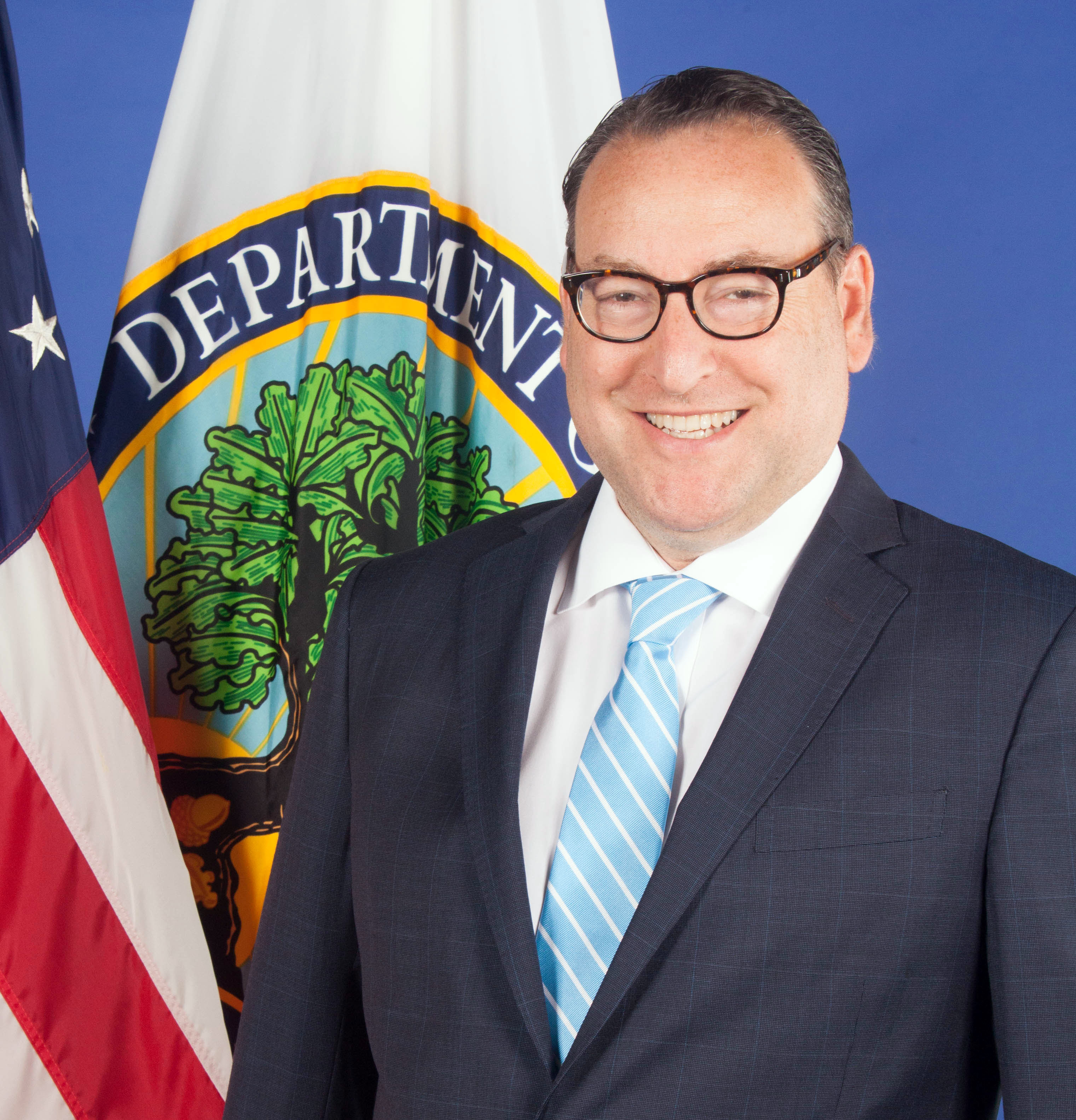

Assistant Secretary of Education for Civil Rights
- In office August 6, 2018 – July 31, 2020
- President: Donald Trump
- Preceded by: Catherine E. Lhamon
- Succeeded by: Kimberly Richey (acting); Catherine E. Lhamon

Personal details
- Born: Sharon, Massachusetts, U.S.
- Education: Williams College (BA); University of California, Berkeley (JD)

Kenneth L. Marcus is an American attorney, academic, and government official. He is the founder and chairman of the Brandeis Center. He was the Assistant Secretary for Civil Rights at the United States Department of Education from August 6, 2018, through July 9, 2020, after which he resumed his position at the Brandeis Center. While working at the Department of Education's Office for Civil Rights, Marcus authored a reinterpretation of the Title VI of the Civil Rights Act of 1964 to expand protections against racial discrimination in education to include religious discrimination. Marcus has also advocated for the adoption of the IHRA definition of antisemitism.

Marcus previously served as the Lillie and Nathan Ackerman Chair in Equality and Justice in America at Baruch College in New York. He also previously served as staff director of the United States Commission on Civil Rights (OCR).

== Education ==
Marcus was raised in Sharon, Massachusetts, and graduated from Sharon High School in 1984. He then attended Williams College, where he was a member of Phi Beta Kappa and graduated magna cum laude in 1988. He received a Juris Doctor from University of California, Berkeley, School of Law, Boalt Hall in 1991.

== Career ==
=== Berkeley Three case ===
Early in his career, Marcus served as lead counsel for the Berkeley Three, three neighbors in Berkeley, California who had protested against a planned low-income housing project for the homeless in their neighborhood in 1993 by the U.S. Department of Housing and Urban Development (HUD). A housing rights group complained about the protests and four federal HUD officials began investigating the neighbors. The neighbors, represented by Marcus and the Center for Individual Rights, sued the officials alleging that the investigation had violated their First Amendment rights. In 1998, a federal district court ruled in favor of the neighbors and the verdict was upheld by the U.S. Court of Appeals for the Ninth Circuit in 2000 which, in a unanimous opinion, held that the investigating officials "could not have reasonably believed their actions to be consistent with the First Amendment." Publicity regarding the case forced HUD to change its policy on fair housing investigations.

=== Fair Housing Enforcement ===
Marcus served in various roles in the George W. Bush administration, beginning as General Deputy Assistant Secretary at the Office of Fair Housing and Equal Opportunity. Marcus also joined with Department of Justice officials to announce the resolution of various high-profile disabilities lawsuits. In a congressional hearing in 2002, he testified about the agency's performance under his stewardship. He said the agency's aged-case backlog had reduced from 80 percent to 37.1 percent and that HUD increased the number of accessible housing units for a person with a disability by over 1200 through major cases in the District of Columbia and Boston. He also announced new initiatives to address predatory lending and lending discrimination, as well as enhanced attention to housing problems faced by persons in the Southwest border area.

=== Office for Civil Rights ===
Marcus served as Staff Director of the U.S. Commission on Civil Rights from 2004 to 2008.

In May 2004, Marcus issued a letter admonishing recipients of federal education funds that in order to comply with Title IX they must designate a Title IX coordinator because OCR had found that some institutions were not complying with the requirement. Members of the National Coalition for Women and Girls in Education had urged OCR to issue such guidance to strengthen Title IX. The Feminist Majority Foundation welcomed the letter.

Marcus joined with then-Assistant Attorney General for Civil Rights Rene Alexander Acosta to issue guidance warning school districts to cease racially segregated activities. Their joint letter warned that practices such as holding segregated high school proms or naming separate race-based sets of recipients for senior-year honors (such as homecoming queen) "are inconsistent with federal law and should not be tolerated."

==== Reinterpretation of Title VI ====
Marcus, while working at the Office for Civil Rights of the US Department of Education (2004–2008), reinterpreted Title VI of the Civil Rights Act of 1964, which had been established to protect against racial discrimination in Jim Crow laws affecting education, to include protections against discrimination on the basis of religion, particularly "when an affected student’s 'shared ancestry' would have been treated as a 'race' in earlier jurisprudence." According to Jason Brownlee, a political scientist at the University of Texas at Austin, Marcus "subsequently became one of the preeminent advocates for applying Title VI against speech and events criticizing Israeli repression of Palestinians, deeds Marcus considered antisemitic," and advocated for the adoption of the IHRA definition of antisemitism.

In an official letter, Marcus clarified in 2004 that OCR would interpret Title VI and Title IX as if they protected the rights of ethnic groups that shared a religious faith, to the same extent as if they did not share a common faith. The policy has been applied to Jewish, Muslim, and Sikh students. The reinterpretation has been cited and strengthened by the Obama, Trump and Biden administrations, coming to be known as the “Marcus Doctrine.”

In October 2004, Marcus issued a notice amending the regulations implementing Title IX of the Education Amendments of 1972. The purpose of the notice was to facilitate for school districts to offer single-sex public elementary and secondary education.

James S. Murphy, in The Atlantic wrote about Marcus's service at OCR: "With Marcus, the administration started taking a stronger approach to enforcing civil-rights laws. During his term, he issued guidance reminding schools of the need to have a Title IX officer and clarifying that Title VI also protected students of faith from discrimination."

=== Academic career ===
After he left government, Marcus served as the Lillie and Nathan Ackerman Visiting Professor of Equality and Justice in America at the City University of New York Baruch College School of Public Affairs. He taught courses on Diversity Management, Anti-Semitism and Civil Rights Law, and Law for the Education Administrator. He also oversaw the Ackerman Lecture Series, which invites intellectuals and public figures to spur debate and new thinking on equality and social justice.

While serving on the CUNY faculty, Marcus also directed an anti-Semitism program at the Institute for Jewish and Community Research.

=== Civil rights advocacy and opposition to antisemitism ===
Later in 2011, Marcus founded the Louis D. Brandeis Center for Human Rights Under Law to "advance the civil and human rights of the Jewish people and promote justice for all." Widely regarded as a “leading authority on antisemitism” and civil rights law, Marcus has worked extensively to combat campus antisemitism using federal civil rights statutes.

In 2012, he was featured on The Forward's "Forward 50" list of 50 American Jews who made a significant impact on the Jewish story in the past year. The magazine characterized him as "a former staff director at the U.S. Department of Education, Marcus, 46, has emerged as a vocal proponent of using federal civil rights law to combat perceived campus anti-Semitism in the context of the Israel debate" and mentioned his use of Title VI of the Civil Rights Act of 1964 to do so.

Marcus opposes the BDS movement that calls for comprehensive boycotts against Israel, similar to those imposed on South Africa during the Apartheid era. He believes that BDS is an attempt to "resist the normalization of the Jewish people." However, determining whether BDS is antisemitic is a difficult question to answer, according to Marcus. He has therefore developed a list of criteria to determine when BDS becomes antisemitic. The list includes examples such as unconscious hostility towards Jews, and the transmission of negatively coded cultural myths.

=== Education lawsuits ===
Marcus has helped file or otherwise support Title VI complaints filed with the OCR, all related to the Israeli-Palestinian conflict. In the first complaint Marcus filed in 2011, he claimed the chair of the Asian and Middle Eastern Cultures department at Barnard College had "steered" a Jewish student away from taking a class with Joseph Massad, a Palestinian professor and outspoken critic of Israel. He claimed Massad had created a hostile environment for Jewish students.

University President Lee Bollinger defended Massad and said it was "extremely unfair" he was named in the complaint since he played no part in the alleged "steering." The complaint was dismissed by the OCR for lack of evidence and also noted the student was not even eligible to take Massad's class.

OCR dismissed four more of Marcus' complaints "with written determination letters stating that the First Amendment protects speech critical of the state of Israel and that such speech does not constitute a civil rights violation." A fifth case was dismissed due to insufficient evidence and a sixth was settled before it was investigated.

=== Assistant Secretary of Education for Civil Rights ===
In October 2017, Trump nominated Marcus to Assistant Secretary of Education for Civil Rights to head OCR. The nomination was confirmed by the US Senate in June 2018. Marcus was endorsed by a variety of groups, including B'nai B'rith and American Jewish Committee, and opposed by groups including The U.S. Campaign for Palestinian Rights and Jewish Voice for Peace.

In September 2018, Marcus reopened a seven-year-old Title VI case against Rutgers University, previously closed by the Obama administration. The Zionist Organization of America welcomed the reopening of the case. In May 2020, nine civil rights groups filed a complaint against Marcus, charging that he had abused his authority and side-stepped department policy by reopening the case. Jonathan Tobin wrote such criticisms are "toxic partisanship," and that even Marcus's critics acknowledge his accomplishments and that he has done "as much, if not more, to fight anti-Semitism on college campuses as anyone in government has ever done." Ian Lustick, writing in The Forward, deplored both Marcus's appointment, and his use of his office, arguing that: "Marcus came to his position not to protect and expand learning opportunities in American educational institutions, but to threaten and narrow them, especially when it comes to open debate about Israel and the Palestinians. And his use of accusations of anti-Semitism in order to silence debate about Israel is being done with the sanction of the President of the United States."

During his time as Assistant Secretary of Education, Marcus led investigations involving sexual harassment in both elementary and upper-level education. "Mr. Marcus...is credited with overseeing the completion of sexual misconduct rules" and he "helped craft new rules for how schools must respond to allegations of sexual harassment and assault." One of Marcus’s main goals was to "end the false dichotomy of protecting survivors while ignoring due process, or protecting the accused, while disregarding sexual misconduct," and address imbalances in the handling of sexual misconduct allegations in educational institutions.

Marcus believed that under the Obama administration, sexual misconduct allegations were over-enforced, and that those who were accused of sexual misconduct were often deprived of their right to presumption of innocence and due process. Marcus advocated for Title IX enforcement reforms that introduced enhanced procedural safeguards, including the right to a trial including cross-examination and witness testimony for individuals accused of sexual misconduct. These changes replaced the "preponderance of evidence" standard with a "clear and convincing evidence" threshold. Critics have pointed out that the bar of "clear and convincing evidence" is higher than what is used in employment law.

Additionally, Marcus introduced new Title IX policy regulations, including expanding the definition of discriminatory sexual harassment to include "sexual assault, dating violence, domestic violence, and stalking." Marcus’s policy also required schools to establish accessible reporting options for anyone to report incidents of sexual abuse, aiming to enhance support for victims. Marcus stated that his regulatory adjustments aim to restore fairness and due process within educational settings while also respecting the rights and experiences of sexual assault survivors.

Marcus has encountered criticism from advocacy groups such as Know Your IX and educational policy nonprofits such as the American Council on Education, who both stated that revoking Obama-era policies towards sexual harassment accusations during the COVID-19 pandemic was inappropriate, and possibly "retraumatizing" to sexual assault victims subjected to cross-examination. Proponents of Marcus’s policies have defended these measures, calling the cross examination a "necessary evil" to ensure fairness for all parties involved in Title IX proceedings.

In 2020, the Education Department announced that the Pennsylvania State University had to strengthen sexual misconduct investigation, despite having already faced backlash surrounding their procedures after the Jerry Sandusky controversy. Marcus described Penn State's handling of sexual harassment cases as "disappointing that so many serious problems have remained at that university system."

Also during his tenure, the Department of Education announced an agreement with the University of Southern California to solve "systemic failures" in wake of the sexual abuse allegations made against George Tyndall, the school's gynecologist. Marcus sent a 51-page letter to the university to report the findings surrounding sexual misconduct involving students and staff.

In one of his biggest cases, Marcus required the Chicago Public Schools to substantially revamp their process for handling sexual violence and harassment cases. This was based on what Marcus called "the most comprehensive investigation" the department's office for civil rights "has ever undertaken of sexual violence in a major urban public school system."

Under Marcus, the Education Department established a new Center for Outreach, Prevention, Education, and Nondiscrimination (OPEN) within OCR. The purpose of the new initiative was to help schools, educators, and students understand and apply education civil rights laws. Critics of the OPEN Center argued that colleges and schools might be leery about cooperating with the Department. One potential barrier to the effectiveness of the Center is that educational institutions may be wary to allow OCR "under the hood" when not required to do so.

After changing Title IX regulations and self-reportedly returning OCR to a "neutral, impartial civil rights law enforcement agency," Marcus resigned in July 2020 and returned to the Brandeis Center as chairman of the board.

=== Advocacy during the Gaza war ===
On October 25, shortly after the beginning of Gaza war protests at universities, the Brandeis Center and the Anti-Defamation League (ADL) sent an open letter, co-signed by Marcus in his capacity as founder and chairman of the Brandeis Center, along with its president Alyza D. Lewin and Jonathan Greenblatt of the ADL, to about 200 college and university presidents, calling on them to investigate Students for Justice in Palestine (SJP) for "for potential violations of the prohibition against materially supporting a foreign terrorist organization".

In March 2024, The New York Times ran a story on Marcus with the headline "The Man Who Helped Redefine Campus Antisemitism" highlighting his push for the adoption of the IHRA definition of antisemitism.

In 2025, Marcus applauded Columbia University's decision to incorporate the IHRA definition of antisemitism and, in a story about Columbia genocide scholar Marianne Hirsch considering withdrawing from teaching as a consequence of Columbia's decision, he said "there are undoubtedly some Columbia professors who will feel they cannot continue teaching under the new regime" and "to the extent that they self-terminate, it may be sad for them personally, but it may not be so bad for the students at Columbia University."

=== George Mason University Board of Visitors ===
In June 2024, Virginia governor Glenn Youngkin appointed Marcus to the George Mason University Board of Visitors. The following January, Democrats in the Virginia Senate rejected the appointment, and Marcus departed the board.

== Views ==
=== Zionism and antisemitism ===
In his 2007 article "Anti-Zionism as Racism: Campus Anti-Semitism and the Civil Rights Act of 1964", Marcus identifies four main views on the relationship between anti-Zionism and antisemitism, at least in North America:

1. that anti-Zionism is antisemitic in its essence and in most, if not all, of its manifestations. Marcus notes that "Relatively few commentators have taken the more extreme position that all anti-Zionism is anti-Semitism", but gives the example of Irwin Cotler as someone who takes this position.
2. that anti-Zionism and antisemitism are both analytically and historically distinct, but the two ideologies have merged since 1948. Marcus attributes this view to Robert Wistrich.
3. that anti-Zionism and antisemitism remain distinct, but anti-Zionism occasionally crosses the line into "outright anti-Semitism", while antisemitism often "pollutes anti-Zionist discourse". Marcus's examples are Deborah E. Lipstadt in the US and the All-Party Parliamentary Inquiry into Antisemitism in the UK.
4. that anti-Zionism is "analytically distinct from antisemitism", but much apparent criticism of Israel or Zionism is in fact a thinly veiled expression of antisemitism^{(pp. 845–846)}

== Publications ==
=== Books ===
- The Definition of Anti-Semitism, Oxford University Press, 2015
- Jewish Identity and Civil Rights in America, Cambridge University Press, 2010

=== Articles ===
- "The Second Mutation: Israel and Political Anti-Semitism", inFocus Spring 2008 • Vol. II: No. 1
- "Anti-Zionism as Racism: Campus Anti-Semitism and the Civil Rights Act of 1964", William and Mary Bill of Rights Journal, Vol. 15, pp. 837–891, 2007
- "The Resurgence of Anti-Semitism on American College Campuses", Current Psychology, Vol. 26, Nos. 3 & 4, 2007
- "The Most Important Right We Think We Have But Don't: Freedom from Religious Discrimination in Education". Nevada Law Journal, Vol. 7, p. 171, 2006
- "Jurisprudence of the New Anti-Semitism", Wake Forest Law Review, Vol. 44, 2009.

=== Testimonies ===
Marcus has several times been used as an expert witness:

- Religious Harassment in Public Schools
- Fighting Anti-Semitism

In November 2012, Marcus testified before the U.S. Commission on Civil Rights as an expert on discrimination against Muslim and Arab Americans. His testimony highlights discrimination in public schools and penal institutions, as well as harmful stereotypes in popular culture.

In June 2024, Marcus testified before the House Ways and Means Committee on the topic of “antisemitism, radical faculty, and the failure of university leadership” on college campuses in the wake of the Gaza war. He emphasized the need for university leadership to take accountability for “student violent extremism” and “professorial politicization” contributing to Jewish hate on campus.

== Notes and references ==
=== Sources ===
- Truesdell, Stefany (2016). The Nature of the BDS Movement on US College Campuses: A Brief Analysis in Three Case Studies (Thesis thesis). Brandeis University.
- Green, Erica L. (September 12, 2018). "Education Dept. Reopens Rutgers Case Charging Discrimination Against Jewish Students". The New York Times.

Political offices
Preceded by Catherine E. Lhamon	Assistant Secretary of Education for Civil Rights; 2018–2020	Succeeded by Kimberly Richey; Acting
