= Roland James =

American football player (born 1958)

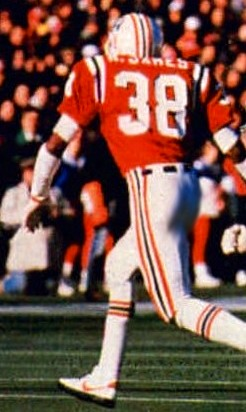
- James with the New England Patriots in 1984

No. 38
- Positions: Cornerback, safety

Personal information
- Born: February 18, 1958 (age 68); Xenia, Ohio, U.S.
- Listed height: 6 ft 2 in (1.88 m)
- Listed weight: 191 lb (87 kg)

Career information
- High school: Greeneview (Jamestown, Ohio)
- College: Tennessee
- NFL draft: 1980: 1st round, 14th overall pick

Career history
- New England Patriots (1980–1990)

Awards and highlights
- New England Patriots All-1980s Team; 2× First-team All-SEC (1978, 1979)

Career NFL statistics
- Interceptions: 29
- Fumble recoveries: 9
- Sacks: 5
- Stats at Pro Football Reference

Roland Orlando James (born February 18, 1958) is an American former professional football player who spent his entire 11 year career for the New England Patriots of the National Football League (NFL) during the 1980s and early 1990s. James played college football for the Tennessee Volunteers, earning All-American honors. He was selected in the first round of the 1980 NFL draft.

== College career ==
James attended the University of Tennessee, and played for the Tennessee Volunteers football team from 1976 to 1979. As of 2011, James has the fourth longest punt return in the history of the University of Tennessee, an 89-yard return against Vanderbilt in 1979. While at Tennessee, Roland played in three bowl games: the Hula, Senior and Bluebonnet bowls.

== Professional career ==
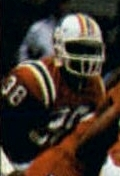
James playing for the Patriots in Super Bowl XX.

James had the longest punt return in the NFL during the 1980 season. He returned a punt 75 yards for a touchdown in the Patriots 34–21 win over the New York Jets at Schaefer Stadium on November 2. James recorded five sacks in 1981.

He intercepted a pass by David Woodley on the last play of the Patriots 3–0 "Snow Plow" victory over the Miami Dolphins on December 12, 1982.

James intercepted three passes by Joe Ferguson in the third quarter of the Patriots 31–0 shutout of the Buffalo Bills at Rich Stadium on 10–23–83, becoming the first player in club history to record three interceptions in the same quarter.

He tackled Frank Middleton for a safety in the Patriots 50–17 rout of the Indianapolis Colts on November 18, 1984.

James recovered 10 fumbles during the regular season and recovered a fumble by Freeman McNeil in the Patriots 26–14 AFC Wild Card Round win over the New York Jets on December 28, 1985.

He had 29 interceptions and 42 punt returns in 145 regular season games for the New England Patriots.

James played in five playoff games for the New England Patriots.

== Post-playing career ==
James went on to coach the Sharon High School football team in Sharon, Massachusetts. His son, Roland James Jr., played for Hofstra. His son, Roman, played free safety at Baylor University. He currently resides in Sharon, Massachusetts and is working as the Director of Youth Services at the Somerville Community Youth Program in Somerville, Massachusetts, and is active in other charitable work.
