= Ted Philips =

American politician

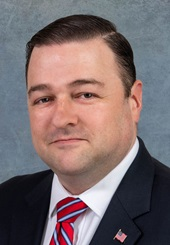

Member of the Massachusetts House of Representatives from the 8th Norfolk District district
- Incumbent
- Assumed office January 6, 2021
- Preceded by: Louis Kafka

Personal details
- Born: 1983 (age 42–43) Boston, Massachusetts
- Party: Democratic
- Spouse: Bridget Philips
- Education: University of Massachusetts, Amherst (BA); Suffolk University (MPA)

Edward R. "Ted" Philips (born 1983) is an American politician who is the Representative for the 8th Norfolk District in the Massachusetts House of Representatives.

== Early life, education, and career ==
Philips was born in 1983 in Boston. His father was a middle school teacher. Philips was raised in Sharon, Massachusetts and graduated from Sharon High School in 2001. He studied political science at the University of Massachusetts Amherst, and received an MPA from the Sawyer School of Business at Suffolk University.

Upon graduating from the University of Massachusetts, Philips joined the Finance Committee for the town of Sharon. In 2006, he worked for State Senator Stephen Brewer. The following year, Philips joined State Representative Louis Kafka's office as a legislative aide. By 2020, Philips was staff director for Representative Kafka. In 2017, Philips ran for the Democratic nomination for the Bristol and Norfolk State Senate district, but lost to Paul Feeney.

== Massachusetts General Court ==
In December 2019, Philips announced his intention to succeed Kafka, who had announced his retirement. Along with Kafka, Philips received endorsements from 21 unions, as well as notable members of the Massachusetts General Court including Speaker Pro Tempore Patricia Haddad. His campaign focused on improving public transportation, elder care and economic development.

On Tuesday, September 1, 2020, Philips won the Democratic Primary in the 8th Norfolk District. He was unopposed in the general election on November 3, 2020, and was sworn in on January 6, 2021. In 2022, Philips defeated Republican Howard Terban, a local small business owner, in the general election. Philips was unopposed in 2024.

Philips, since his inauguration, has been one of the main supporters of Student Government Day in Massachusetts.

=== Electoral history ===
Massachusetts' 8th Norfolk District general election, 2022
Party	Candidate	Votes	%
Democratic	Ted Philips	12,257	69.4
Republican	Howard L. Terban	5,400	30.6
Total votes		17,665	100.0

Massachusetts' 8th Norfolk District Democratic Primary, 2020
Party	Candidate	Votes	%
Democratic	Ted Philips	5,315	51.81
Democratic	Andrew Flowers	4,944	48.19
Total votes		10,259	100.00

2017 Massachusetts Bristol and Norfolk Special Democratic Primary
Party	Candidate	Votes	%
Democratic	Paul Feeney	3,152	58.4
Democratic	Ted Philips	2,222	41.2
Write-in		21	0.4
Total votes		5,395	100.0
