= Obesity Surgery =

- Discipline: Bariatric surgery
- Language: English
- Edited by: Scott Shikora

Publication details
- History: 1991-present
- Publisher: Springer Science+Business Media
- Frequency: Monthly
- Impact factor: 3.1 (2024)

Standard abbreviations
- ISO 4: Obes. Surg.

Indexing
- CODEN: OBSUEB
- ISSN: 0960-8923 (print); 1708-0428 (web)
- LCCN: 2001301458
- OCLC no.: 23835796

Links
- Journal homepage; Online archive

Obesity Surgery is a monthly peer-reviewed medical journal covering bariatric surgery. It was established in 1991 and is published by Springer Science+Business Media. It is the official journal of the International Federation for the Surgery of Obesity and Metabolic Disorders. The editor-in-chief is Scott Shikora (Brigham and Women's Hospital). According to the Journal Citation Reports, the journal has a 2015 impact factor of 3.346. According to Web of Science, the 2024 Journal Impact Factor has been 2,9, ranking it in the first quartile of the category "Surgery".

The journal is the official publication of the International Federation for the Surgery of Obesity and Metabolic Disorders.

== International Federation for the Surgery of Obesity and Metabolic Disorders ==
The International Federation for the Surgery of Obesity and Metabolic Disorders (IFSO) is an international federation of national associations of bariatric surgeons and integrated health professionals. The IFSO was founded in 1995 at an international obesity surgery meeting in Stockholm, Sweden.

=== Activities ===
Since its founding the IFSO has hosted an annual World Congress as a forum for discussion on the surgical treatment of severely obese patients. Additionally, every year the IFSO organizes a roundtable as part of World Obesity Day.

The IFSO publishes guidelines and statements on severe obesity and its treatment. For example, in 2022 the IFSO collaborated with the American Society for Metabolic & Bariatric Surgery (ASMBS) to update the indications for metabolic and bariatric surgery, replacing the previous guidelines established by the National Institutes of Health in 1991.

=== Member societies ===
As of 2025 the IFSO has 76 member societies.

Argentina
- Sociedad Argentina de Cirugia de la Obesidad (SACO)

Australia – New Zealand

- Australian & New Zealand Obesity Surgery Society (ANZMOSS)

Austria

- Österreichische Gesellschaft für Adipositas- und metabolische Chirurgie

Azerbaijan

- Azerbaijan Bariatric and Metabolic Surgery Association (ABMSA)

Bahrain

- Bahrain Surgeons Association

Belgium

- Belgian section for obesity and metabolic surgery (BeSOMS)

Bolivia

- Sociedad Boliviana de Cirugia Comite Cirugia Bariatrica Y Metabolica (SBCCCM)

Brazil

- Sociedade Brasileira de Cirurgia Bariátrica e Metabólica (SBCBM)

Bulgaria

- Bulgarian Society of Bariatric and Metabolic Surgery

Canada

- Canadian Association of Bariatric Physicians and Surgeons (CABPS)

Chile

- Sociedad Chilena De Cirugia Bariátrica Y Metabólica (SCCBM)

China

- Chinese Society for Metabolic & Bariatric Surgery (CSMBS)

Colombia

- Asociación Colombiana de Obesidad y Cirugía Bariátrica (ACOCIB)

Costa Rica

- Asociacion Costarricense de Obesidad, Metabolismo y Trastornos Alimentarios (ACROMTA)

Czech Republic

- Czech Society for the Study of Obesity (CSSO)

Dominican Republic

- Sociedad Dominicana de Cirugia Metabolica Y Bariatrica (SODOCIMEB)

Ecuador

- Sociedad Ecuatoriana de Cirugía Bariátrica y Metabólica (SECBAMET)

Egypt

- Egyptian Society for Bariatric Surgery (ESBS)

El Salvador

- Asociacion de Cirugia Endoscopica de El Salvador (ACEDES)

Finland

- Finnish Association of Bariatric and Metabolic Surgery (LIME)

France

- Société Française et Francophone de Chirurgie de l’Obésité et des Maladies Métaboliques (SOFFCO.MM)

Germany

- Surgical Working Group of Obesity Therapy (CA-ADIP)

Georgia

- Georgian Society for Bariatric and Metabolic Surgery

Greece

- Greek Society for Obesity Surgery and Metabolic Diseases

Guatemala

- Asociacion de Cirguia Bariatrica y Metabolica de Guatemala (ACBMG)

Hong Kong

- The Hong Kong Society for Metabolic and Bariatric Surgery (HKSMBS)

Honduras

- Honduras Bariatric Surgery Association (HBSA)

Hungary

- Hungarian Association for Bariatric and Metabolic Surgery Association (HBMSA)

Iceland

- The Icelandic Society for Metabolic and Bariatric Surgery (ISMBS)

India

- Obesity Surgery Society of India (OSSI)

Indonesia

- Indonesian Metabolic and Bariatric Association (IMBAS)

Iran

- Iranian Society of Metabolic & Bariatric Surgery (IRSMBS)

Iraq

- Iraqi Society for Metabolic and Bariatric Surgery (IQSMBS)

Israel

- Israeli Society for Metabolic and Bariatric Surgery (ISMBS)

Italy

- Società Italiana di Chirurgia dell’Obesità e delle malattie metaboliche (SICOB)

Japan

- Japanese Society for the Study of Obesity (JSSO)

Jordan

- Jordanian Society for Obesity Surgery (JSOT)

Kazakhstan

- Society of Bariatric and Metabolic Surgeons of Kazakhstan (SBMSK)

Korea

- Korean Society for Metabolic and Bariatric Surgery (KSMBS)

Kuwait

- Kuwait Laparoscopic and Obesity Surgical Society (KLOSS)

Lebanon

- Lebanese Society for General Surgery (LSGS)

Lithuania

- Lithuanian Bariatric Surgery Society

Libya

- Libyan Society of Metabolic and Bariatric Surgery

Malaysia

- Malaysian Society for Metabolic and Bariatric Surgery

Mexico

- Colegio Mexicano de Cirugía para la Obesidad y Enfermedades Metabólicas, A. C.

Netherlands

- Dutch Society for Metabolic and Bariatric Surgery (DSMBS)

Norway

- Norwegian Society for the Surgery of Obesity

Pakistan

- Pakistan Society of Metabolic and Bariatric Surgery (PSMBS)

Panama

- Asociación Panameña de Cirugía Bariátrica (APCB)

Paraguay

- Sociedad Paraguaya de Cirugía Bariátrica y Metabólica (SPCBM)

Peru

- Asociación Peruana de Cirugía Bariátrica y Obesidad Severa (APCBEM)

Philippines

- Philippine Society for Metabolic & Bariatric Surgery (PSMBS)

Poland

- Bariatric Chapter of the Association of Polish Surgeons

Portugal

- Sociedade Portuguesa de Cirurgia de Obesidade (SPCO)

Romania

- Romanian Society for Metabolic Surgery (RSMS)

Russia

- Society of Bariatric Surgeons of Russia (SBSR)

Saudi Arabia

- Saudi Arabian Society for Metabolic and Bariatric Surgery (SASMBS)

Serbia

- Serbian Society for Bariatric and Metabolic Surgery

Singapore

- Obesity and Metabolic Surgery Society of Singapore (OMSSS)

Slovenia

- Slovenian Association of Bariatric Surgeons (SABS)

South Africa

- South African Association for Obesity and Metabolism (SASSO)

Spain

- Sociedad Española de Cirugía de la Obesidad (SECO)

Sri Lanka

- Sri Lankan Society of Metabolic and Bariatric Surgery

Sweden

- Swedish Association for Bariatric Surgery (SABS)

Switzerland

- Swiss Society for the Study of Morbid Obesity and Metabolic Disorders (SMOB)

Taiwan

- Taiwan Society for Metabolic and Bariatric Surgery (TSMBS)

Thailand

- Thai Society for Metabolic & Bariatric Surgery (TSMBS)

Tunisia

- Tunisian Society of Bariatric Surgery (TSBS)

Turkey

- Turkish Obesity Surgery Society (TOSS)

Ukraine

- Ukrainian Association of Bariatric Surgery (UABS)

United Arab Emirates

- Emirates Society of Metabolic and Bariatric Surgery (ESMBS)

United Kingdom

- British Obesity & Metabolic Surgery Society (BOMSS)

Uruguay

- Sociedad Uruguaya de Cirugía Bariátrica y Metabólica (SUCBM)

USA

- American Society for Metabolic and Bariatric Surgery (ASMBS)

Uzbekistan

- Association of Bariatric and Metabolic Surgeons of Uzbekistan (UZAMBS)

Venezuela

- Venezuelan Society of Obesity Surgery (SOVCIBAM)
