= Stoughtonham Furnace Site =

Coordinates: 42.0823°N 71.2122°W

- U.S. National Register of Historic Places
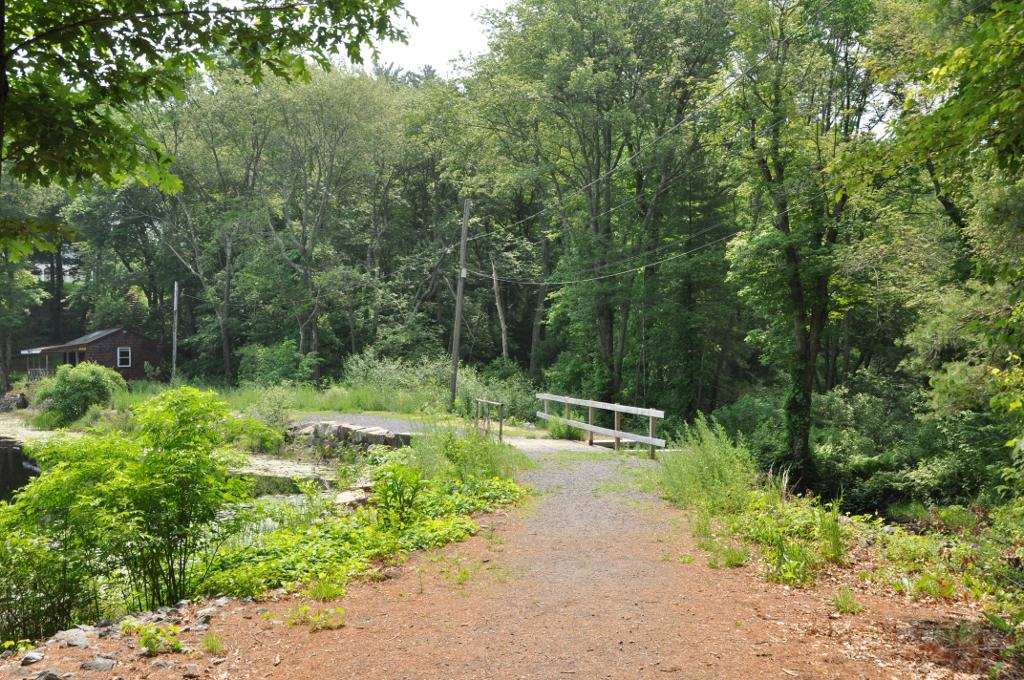
- The dam at Gavins Pond, in or near the site.

- Location within Massachusetts Location within the United States
- Nearest city: Foxborough and Sharon, Massachusetts
- Built: 1762
- NRHP reference No.: 84002881
- Added to NRHP: August 16, 1984

Stoughtonham Furnace Site is the site of a colonial-era iron foundry in Foxborough and Sharon, Massachusetts. First established in the 1760s, the site drew the attention of artillery colonel Richard Gridley following the outbreak of the American Revolutionary War in 1775. Gridley and some business partners acquired the property, and the foundry produced cannons and ammunition for the Continental Army throughout the war.

The site, located in the Gavin's Pond area near the Foxborough line, was added to the National Register of Historic Places in 1984.

== See also ==
- National Register of Historic Places listings in Norfolk County, Massachusetts
