= Sharon Historic District (Sharon, Massachusetts) =

Historic district in Massachusetts, United States

- U.S. National Register of Historic Places
- U.S. Historic district
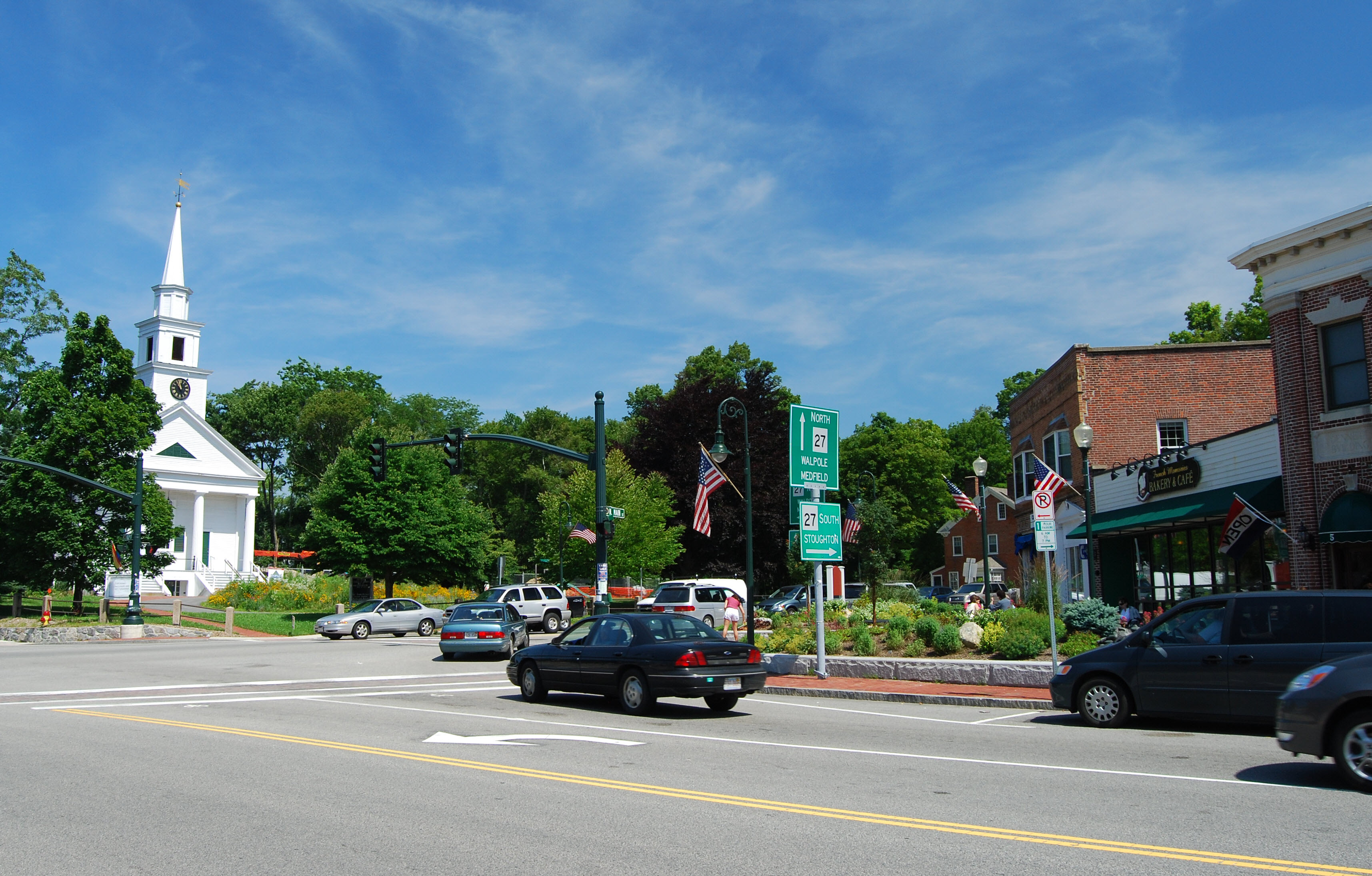

- Location within Massachusetts Location within the United States
- Location: Sharon, Massachusetts
- Coordinates: 42°7′28″N 71°10′45″W
- Built: 1842
- Architectural style: Colonial Revival, Greek Revival, Other
- NRHP reference No.: 75000296
- Added to NRHP: August 22, 1975

The Sharon Historic District is a historic district on both sides of N. Main Street from Post Office Square to School Street in Sharon, Massachusetts. The area includes the earliest formally laid out part of Sharon, when it was established as a parish of Stoughton in 1740. The district was listed on the National Register of Historic Places in 1975.

== Description and history ==
The town of Stoughton was incorporated in 1726 out of Dorchester. Its southern part was established as a separate precinct, which was incorporated as Stoughtonham in 1765 and renamed Sharon in 1783. Sharon Center arose in 1740, around where the precinct's first colonial meeting house was built, now the site of the 1842 Greek Revival Unitarian Church. The only significant surviving pre-20th century landscape in the center is now the single block of North Main Street between Post Office Square and School Street. Included in this area are six houses and two churches, as well as the town library, the district's only civic building. It is a modest Georgian Revival building, constructed in 1914 with funding support from philanthropist Andrew Carnegie.

The oldest building in the district is the Dennett House, dating to about 1753. It was built as a replacement for the first parsonage house, which was destroyed by fire, and stands at the northwestern corner of the district. Between it and the Unitarian Church stand three houses: one is the First Congregational Church Parsonage, a Colonial Revival structure built in 1905, while another is the Dr. Griffin Office, also built as a private residence in 1905. To its south is the 1805 Morse House, the first brick building to be built in the town. Opposite the Morse House stands the 1839 Greek Revival First Congregational Church, with the library just to its south. The church is connected via a long ell to an early 20th century Colonial Revival House, with another similar one standing to its north, opposite the Dennett House at the northern end of the district.

== See also ==
- National Register of Historic Places listings in Norfolk County, Massachusetts
