= Sharon, Massachusetts =

- Town
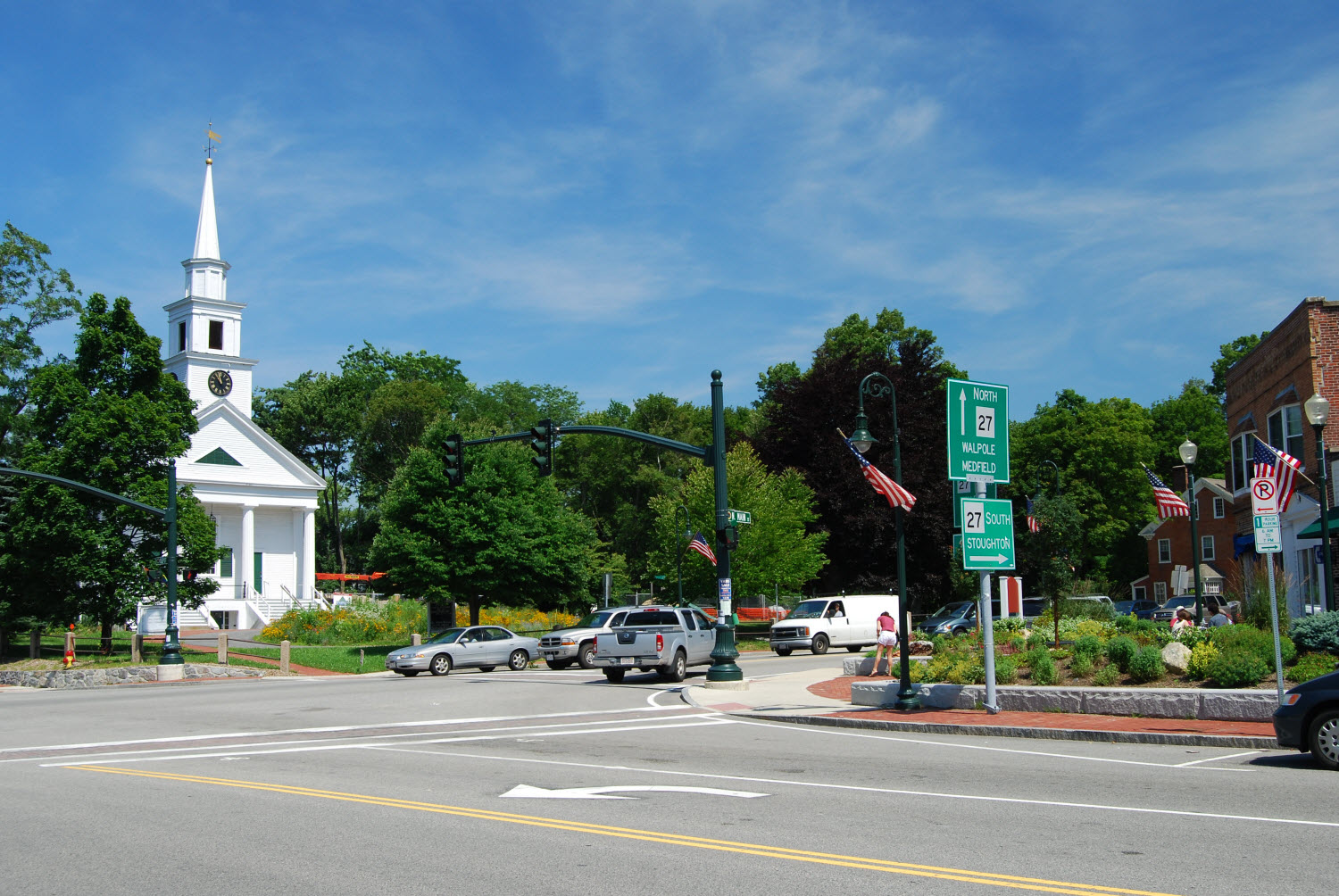
- Downtown Sharon in July 2009

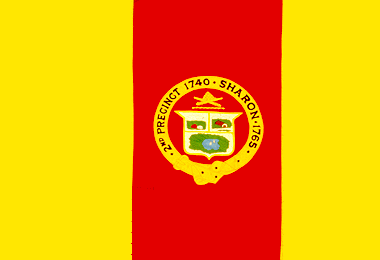
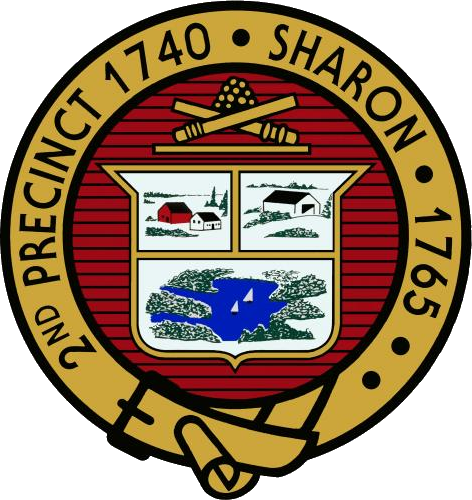
- Flag Seal

- Location in Norfolk County in Massachusetts
- Coordinates: 42°6′46″N 71°11′2″W
- Country: United States
- State: Massachusetts
- County: Norfolk
- Settled: 1650
- Incorporated: 1775

Government
  - Type: Open town meeting
  - Town Administrator: Frederic Turkington
  - Select Board: Kiana Baskin (chair); Hanna Switlekowski (vice-chair); Xander Shapiro (clerk); Sam Liao; Pasqualino Pannone

Area
  - Total: 24.2 sq mi (62.6 km^{2})
  - Land: 23.3 sq mi (60.4 km^{2})
  - Water: 0.85 sq mi (2.2 km^{2}) 3.56%
- Elevation: 249 ft (76 m)

Population (2020)
  - Total: 18,575
  - Density: 796/sq mi (307.5/km^{2})
- Time zone: UTC-5 (EST)
  - Summer (DST): UTC-4 (Eastern)
- ZIP Codes: 02067 (Sharon); 02081 (Walpole)
- Area code: 339 / 781
- FIPS code: 25-60785
- GNIS feature ID: 0618329
- Website: townofsharon.net

Sharon is a town in Norfolk County, Massachusetts, United States. The population was 18,575 at the 2020 census. It contains the census-designated place of the same name. Sharon is part of Greater Boston, about 17 miles (27 km) southwest of downtown Boston, and is connected to both Boston and Providence by the Providence/Stoughton Line.

== History ==
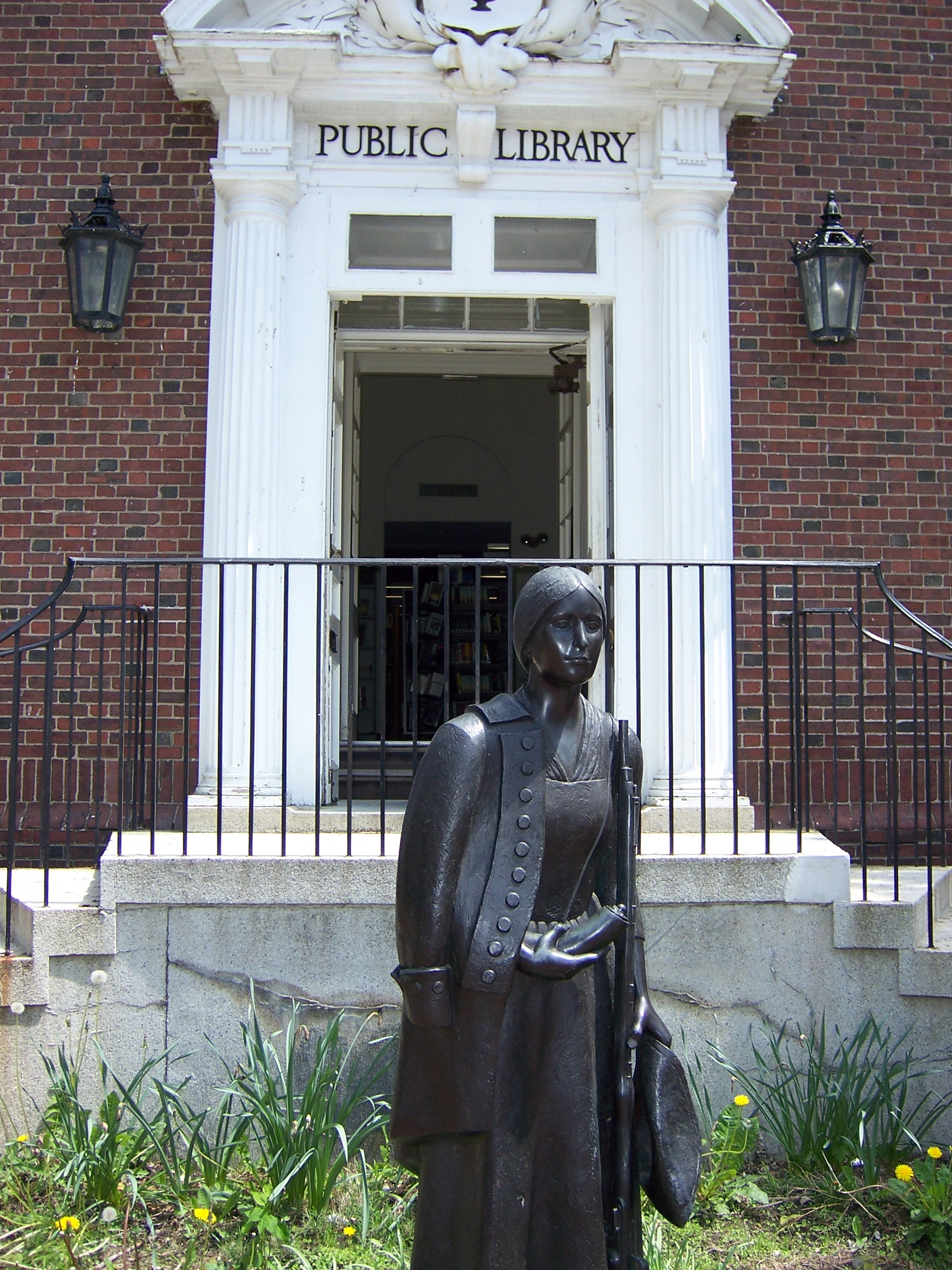
Statue of Deborah Sampson

The Town of Sharon was first settled as part of the Massachusetts Bay Colony in 1637 and was deemed the 2nd precinct of Stoughton in 1740. It was established as the district of Stoughtonham on June 21, 1765, incorporated as the Town of Stoughtonham on August 23, 1775, and was named Sharon on February 25, 1783, after Israel's Sharon plain, due to its high level of forestation. Several towns in New England were given this name. Part of Stoughtonham went to the new town of Foxborough on June 10, 1776. During the American Revolution, the townspeople of Sharon made cannonballs and cannons for the Continental Army at a local foundry.

In front of the Sharon Public Library stands a statue of Deborah Sampson, Sharon's town heroine. Sampson disguised herself as a man to fight in the Revolutionary War. After the war, she married Benjamin Gannett, a farmer, and lived in Sharon until the end of her life. Sampson began a campaign in 1790 to secure a pension from her time in the Revolutionary War, which earned the support of well known public figures, including Paul Revere. In 1804, Revere visited Sampson (then Sampson Gannett) at her farm in Sharon and wrote to the congressman of her district, William Eustis, that he found her "much more deserving than hundreds to whom Congress have been generous." Sampson was placed on the United States pension list a year later, and awarded an annual payment. She is buried in the local Rock Ridge Cemetery. A street in Sharon is named Deborah Sampson Street in her honor. In 1983, the Massachusetts General Court designated Sampson as the official State Heroine of the Commonwealth of Massachusetts.

The Unitarian and Congregational churches in the center of Sharon both have church bells manufactured by Paul Revere.

The recipient of letters from across the United States in Stanley Milgram's small-world experiment lived in Sharon.

Sharon is the former home of the Kendall Whaling Museum, founded by Henry P. Kendall in 1955. In 2001, the museum was merged with the New Bedford Whaling Museum, and its collection is now part of that museum, though the archives of the museum are still held in Sharon.

In Sharon there are six historical properties or districts that are registered with the state. Of the six, five are listed on the National Register and three are certified local historic districts:

In 1970, Sharon's First Historic District becomes an LHD. This is the area on North Main Street from Post Office Square to School Street and includes the Library and the Unitarian and Congregational Churches. It becomes a National Register District in 1975. In 1974 Cobb's Tavern becomes a National Historic Landmark. Located at 41 Bay Road, it becomes Sharon's Second Historic District in 1991. In 1980, Stoneholm, located at 188 Ames Street, becomes a National Historic Landmark. In 1984, the Stoughtonham Furnace Site (partially in Foxborough) becomes a National Historic Landmark. In 1997, Borderland State Park (partially in Easton) becomes a National Register District. In 2004, Sharon's Third Historic District was approved by Town Meeting and accepted by the Commonwealth. This includes the Charles R. Wilber School, the Pleasant Street School, and the Kate Morrell Park.

== Geography ==
According to the United States Census Bureau, the town has a total area of 24.2 square miles (62.6 km^{2}), of which 23.3 square miles (60.4 km^{2}) is land and 0.9 square mile (2.2 km^{2}) (3.56%) is water. This includes Lake Massapoag, which is one of the town's most prominent features and a popular recreational site for swimming and boating. It was largely responsible for the town's early development as a summer resort location. Massapoag is drained by the Canoe River to the south, and Massapoag Brook to the north. Sharon is bordered by the towns of Stoughton and Canton to the east, Mansfield and Easton to the South, Foxborough to the west, and Walpole and Norwood to the north.

=== Climate ===
Sharon is located in a continental climate, like most of New England and most of the Northeastern and Midwestern United States. It is cooler than coastal New England locations because it is inland. The town has warm to hot summers and cold winters. It is often humid in the summer. Sharon receives about 50 inches of precipitation every year on average. According to the Köppen Climate Classification system, Sharon has a humid continental climate, abbreviated "Dfb" on climate maps.

Climate data for Sharon, MA
| Month | Jan | Feb | Mar | Apr | May | Jun | Jul | Aug | Sep | Oct | Nov | Dec | Year |
|---|---|---|---|---|---|---|---|---|---|---|---|---|---|
| Mean daily maximum °F (°C) | 36 (2) | 40 (4) | 48 (9) | 59 (15) | 70 (21) | 78 (26) | 83 (28) | 81 (27) | 73 (23) | 62 (17) | 52 (11) | 41 (5) | 60 (16) |
| Mean daily minimum °F (°C) | 18 (−8) | 21 (−6) | 28 (−2) | 37 (3) | 47 (8) | 57 (14) | 62 (17) | 61 (16) | 53 (12) | 42 (6) | 33 (1) | 24 (−4) | 40 (5) |
| Average precipitation inches (mm) | 3.78 (96) | 3.68 (93) | 4.81 (122) | 4.39 (112) | 3.65 (93) | 4.08 (104) | 3.91 (99) | 3.91 (99) | 3.66 (93) | 4.35 (110) | 4.46 (113) | 4.52 (115) | 49.2 (1,249) |

== Demographics ==
Historical population
| Year | Pop. | ±% |
|---|---|---|
| 1790 | 1,034 | — |
| 1850 | 1,128 | +9.1% |
| 1860 | 1,377 | +22.1% |
| 1870 | 1,508 | +9.5% |
| 1880 | 1,492 | −1.1% |
| 1890 | 1,634 | +9.5% |
| 1900 | 2,060 | +26.1% |
| 1910 | 2,310 | +12.1% |
| 1920 | 2,467 | +6.8% |
| 1930 | 3,351 | +35.8% |
| 1940 | 3,737 | +11.5% |
| 1950 | 4,847 | +29.7% |
| 1960 | 10,070 | +107.8% |
| 1970 | 12,367 | +22.8% |
| 1980 | 13,601 | +10.0% |
| 1990 | 15,517 | +14.1% |
| 2000 | 17,408 | +12.2% |
| 2010 | 17,612 | +1.2% |
| 2020 | 18,575 | +5.5% |
| 2024* | 18,762 | +1.0% |
* = population estimate. Source: United States census records and Population Estimates Program data.

As of the census of 2020, there were 18,442 people, 6,454 households in the town. The population density was 747.0 inhabitants per square mile (288.4/km^{2}).

As of 2020, the racial makeup of the town was 71.2% White, 3.3% African American, 0.1% Native American, 18.4% Asian, 0% Pacific Islander, and 6.2% from two or more races. Hispanic or Latino of any race were 2.1% of the population. According to the American Community Survey administered in 2014, the racial makeup of the town was 76.0% White, 4.2% African American, 0.1% Native American, 16.6% Asian, 0.0% Pacific Islander, 0.4% from other races and 2.7% from two or more races, with Hispanic or Latino of any race at 2.5% of the population.

26.9% of the population speaks a language other than English at home, and 23.2% of the population was born outside of the United States. Sharon has the state's highest proportion of Russian immigrants, estimated at 14.4% in 2010.

The population was spread out, with 27.0% under the age of 18, 5.3% from 18 to 24, 20.0% from 25 to 44, 34.7% from 45 to 64 and 12.7% who were 65 years of age or older. The median age was 43.3 years. For every 100 females, there were 93.2 males. For every 100 females age 18 and over, there were 90.6 males.

As of 2014, the median income for a household in the town was $127,413 and the median income for a family was $144,167. Males had a median income of $100,951 versus $72,917 for females. The per capita income for the town was $56,465. About 1.1% of families and 2.7% of the population were below the poverty line, including 3.0% of those under age 18 and 3.9% of those age 65 or over.

According to the 2014 American Community Survey, 97.6% of adults in Sharon are high school graduates, and 72.8% have a bachelor's degree or higher. Of those 25 and older, 11.3% have completed some college but do not have a degree, 4.7% have an associate degree, 34.7% have a bachelor's degree, and 37.7% have a graduate or professional degree.

Sharon is home to seven synagogues, nine churches, and one of the largest mosques in New England, the Islamic Center of New England.

== Parks and recreation ==
Sharon has a large number of scenic trails due to the high percentage of conservation land within the town's borders. Trails found in Sharon include the Massapoag Trail, the Warner Trail, the Bay Circuit Trail (known as the Beaver Brook Trail in Sharon), and the King Philip's Rock Trail. There are a number of trails at Borderland State Park and at Moose Hill Wildlife Sanctuary.

== Government ==
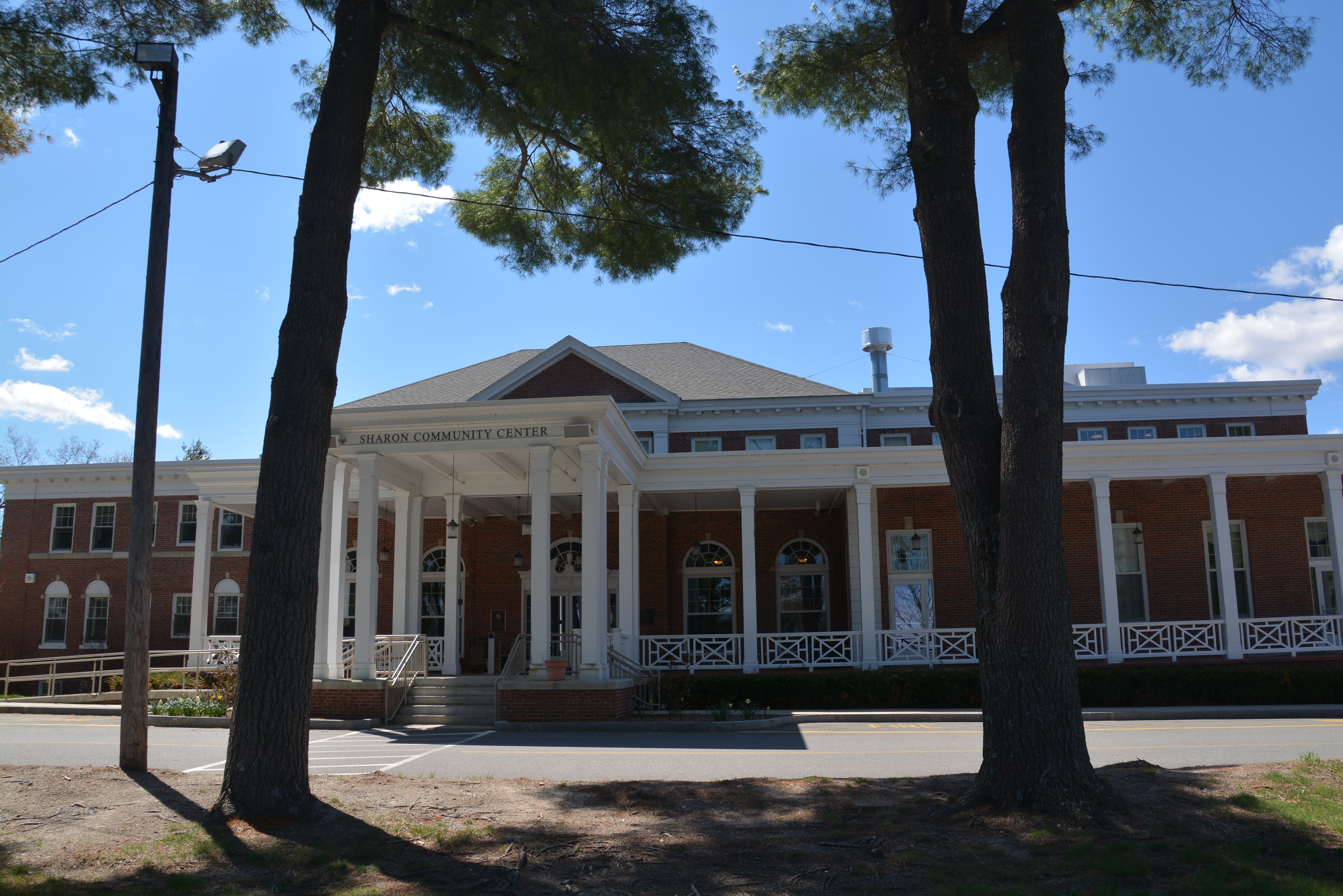
Sharon Community Center

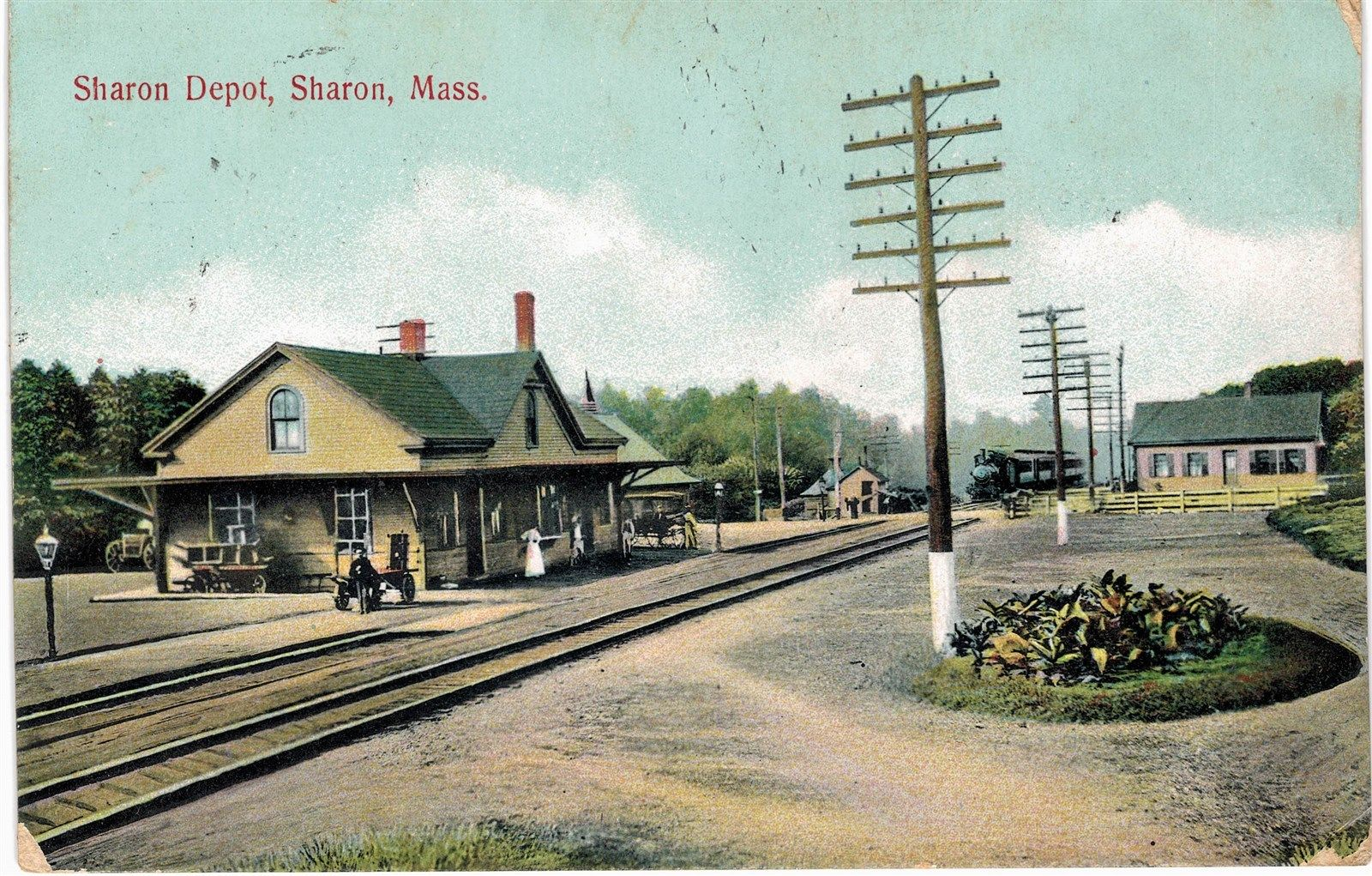
1870s-built Sharon station on a 1908 postcard

Sharon currently has an open town meeting form of government, with a five-member select board. In 2008, a commission was elected to prepare a charter document specifying the executive, legislative, and administrative structure of town government. It considered whether the town should retain its current government form or change to a representative form. There was a debate, whether the town has outgrown open town meeting, where decisions are made only by those attending (who must be present to vote) or whether direct-vote government works well because residents who choose to attend are particularly interested in and informed on the issues. In November 2009, the charter commission recommended a "hybrid" legislative branch consisting of a Legislative Committee (Representative Town Meeting of 17 members) and an Open Town Meeting (which could be called to review the Legislative Committee's decisions if 3% of voters signed a "review petition"). At a town election on May 18, 2010, the charter proposal was rejected by a vote of 1123 yes, 2305 no.

As of February 2016, there are 12,383 registered voters in Sharon. 4,050 (32.7%) are enrolled as Democrats, 968 (7.8%) are enrolled as Republicans, 7,330 (59.2%) do not belong to a party, and 12 belong to other parties.

Sharon is staunchly Democratic, having voted for a Democrat for president in every election since 1956. Sharon last voted for a Republican for a major statewide office in the 2018 Massachusetts gubernatorial election, when Charlie Baker won 63% of the vote.

Sharon is in Massachusetts' 4th congressional district, and is currently represented in the U.S. House of Representatives by Jake Auchincloss and in the U.S. Senate by Elizabeth Warren and Ed Markey. In the Massachusetts General Court, Sharon is represented by Paul Feeney in the Massachusetts Senate and Ted Philips in the Massachusetts House of Representatives.

United States presidential election results for Sharon, Massachusetts
| Year | Republican | | Democratic | | Third party(ies) | |
| Year | No. | % | No. | % | No. | % |
|---|---|---|---|---|---|---|
| 2008 | 3,179 | 31.72% | 6,622 | 66.08% | 220 | 2.20% |
| 2012 | 3,665 | 35.34% | 6,564 | 63.30% | 141 | 1.36% |
| 2016 | 2,447 | 23.57% | 7,219 | 69.54% | 715 | 6.89% |
| 2020 | 2,603 | 22.41% | 8,778 | 75.56% | 236 | 2.03% |
| 2024 | 2,731 | 25.69% | 7,575 | 71.25% | 326 | 3.07% |

== Education ==
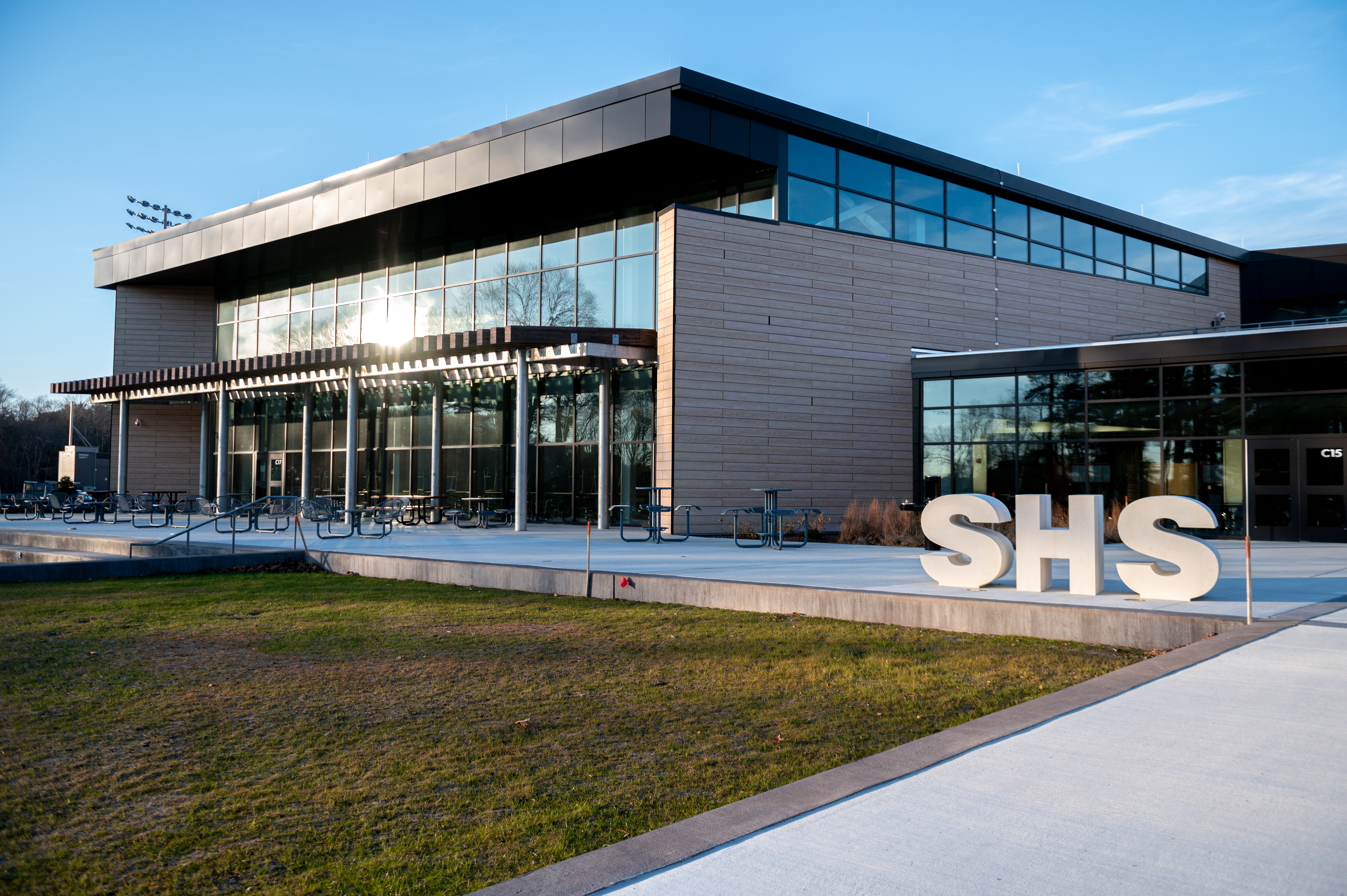
Sharon High School

The Sharon Public Schools system has five schools. Grades K–5 attend one of the three elementary schools: Cottage Street School, East Elementary School, or Heights Elementary School. Grades 6–8 attend Sharon Middle School, and grades 9–12 attend Sharon High School.

The Charles R. Wilber School served as Sharon's high school until 1957, after which it became an intermediate school. In 2009 a new wing was added to the building, and it was converted to residential use.

In 2003 the superintendent, Claire Jackson, sought a Freeman Foundation grant, worth $150,000 per year, for three years, to have East Asian studies and Chinese language coursework.

In 2020, construction of a new high school building commenced and was completed before the beginning of the 2022-2023 school year. The old building, which was well over sixty years old, was demolished during the 2022-2023 school year. The new Sharon High School opened at the beginning of the 2023-2024 school year.

== Transportation ==
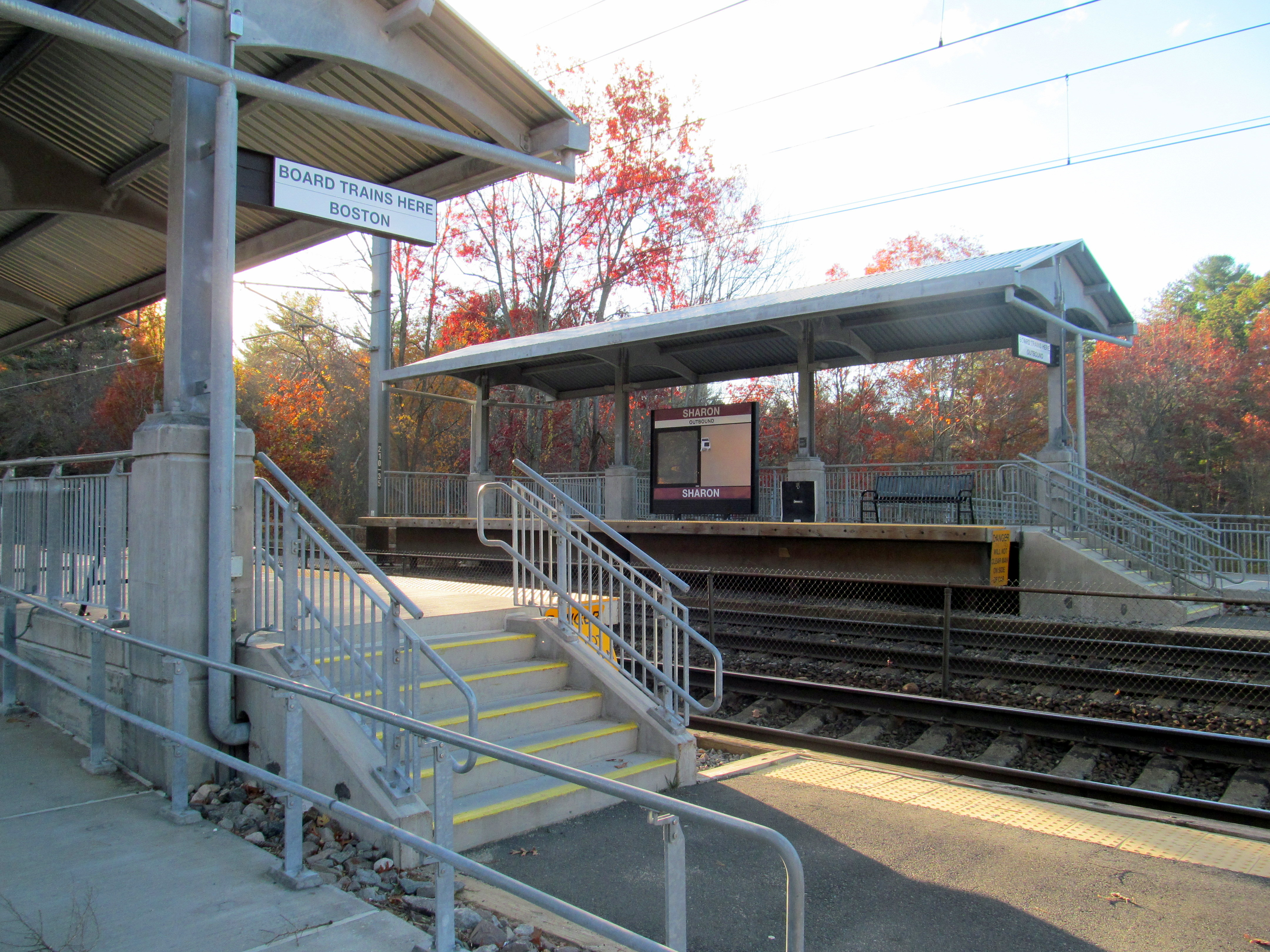
Mini-high platforms at Sharon Station

Commuter rail service from Boston's South Station is provided by the MBTA with a stop in Sharon on its Providence/Stoughton Line.

The Boston and Providence Railroad started full operations between the two cities in June 1835, including a station at the modern location in Sharon. In 1871, the original Sharon station was replaced by a larger building.

Massachusetts Route 27 runs through the center of the town and leads to Route 1.

== Notable people ==
- Mildred Allen, physicist
- Tully Banta-Cain, NFL player
- Leonard Bernstein (1918-1990), composer (summer resident)
- John Brebbia (born 1990), MLB pitcher for Chicago White Sox
- Etan Cohen, Israeli-American screenwriter
- Sarah Palfrey Cooke, US tennis champion
- Joseph A. Cushman, micropaleontologist, foraminiferologist
- Arthur Vining Davis, industrialist and philanthropist
- Jake Fishman (born 1995), American-Israeli MLB and Team Israel baseball player
- Tommy Harper, baseball player
- Amasa Hewins, portrait, genre and landscape painter
- Roland James, football defensive back
- Myron Kaufmann, novelist
- Bill Keating, congressman
- Henry Way Kendall, 1990 Nobel laureate in physics
- Aryeh Klapper, rabbi
- Jack Levin, sociologist
- Evan Marshall, literary agent, novelist
- John McLaughlin, artist
- Bruce Pearl (born 1960), basketball coach
- Ted Philips, Massachusetts politician
- Frank Salemme, Italian/Irish mobster and former boss of Patriarca crime family
- Deborah Sampson, Revolutionary era heroine
- Stephen Schneider, film and television actor
- Pete Seibert, ski resort founder
- Scott A. Shikora, surgeon
- Solomon Talbot, historian
- Andre Tippett (born 1959), Pro Football Hall of Fame linebacker
- Charles Q. Tirrell, congressman
- Nick Zinner, guitarist

== See also ==
- Sharon Historic District
