= Solomon Talbot =

American historian (1814–1913)

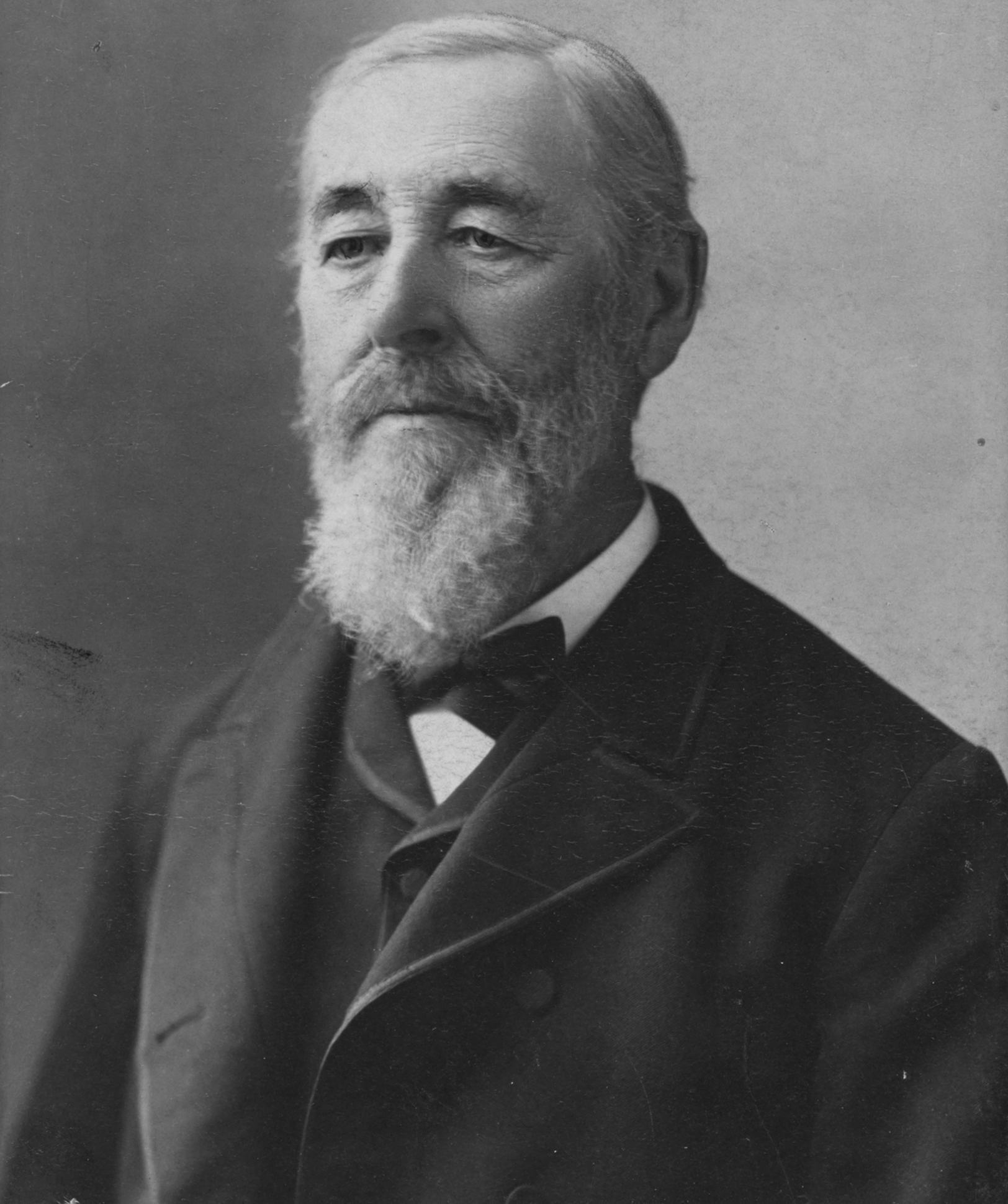
- Talbot c. 1909
- Born: August 19, 1814; Stoughton, Massachusetts, U.S.
- Died: August 1, 1913 (aged 98); Sharon, Massachusetts, U.S.
- Resting place: Pearl Street Cemetery, Sharon, Massachusetts, U.S.
- Occupation: Historian
- Known for: Designing the corporate seal of the town of Sharon in Massachusetts
- Spouse: Emily Eliza Hawes Talbot
- Children: 1

Solomon Talbot (August 19, 1814 – August 1, 1913) was an American historian from New England.

== Career ==
In 1893, Talbot designed the corporate seal of Sharon, Massachusetts. It is still used today and is also featured on the town's flag.

== Personal life ==
Talbot married Emily Eliza Hawes. They had a daughter, Susan Ann Talbot Keith.
