= Jewish on Campus =

Nonprofit organization

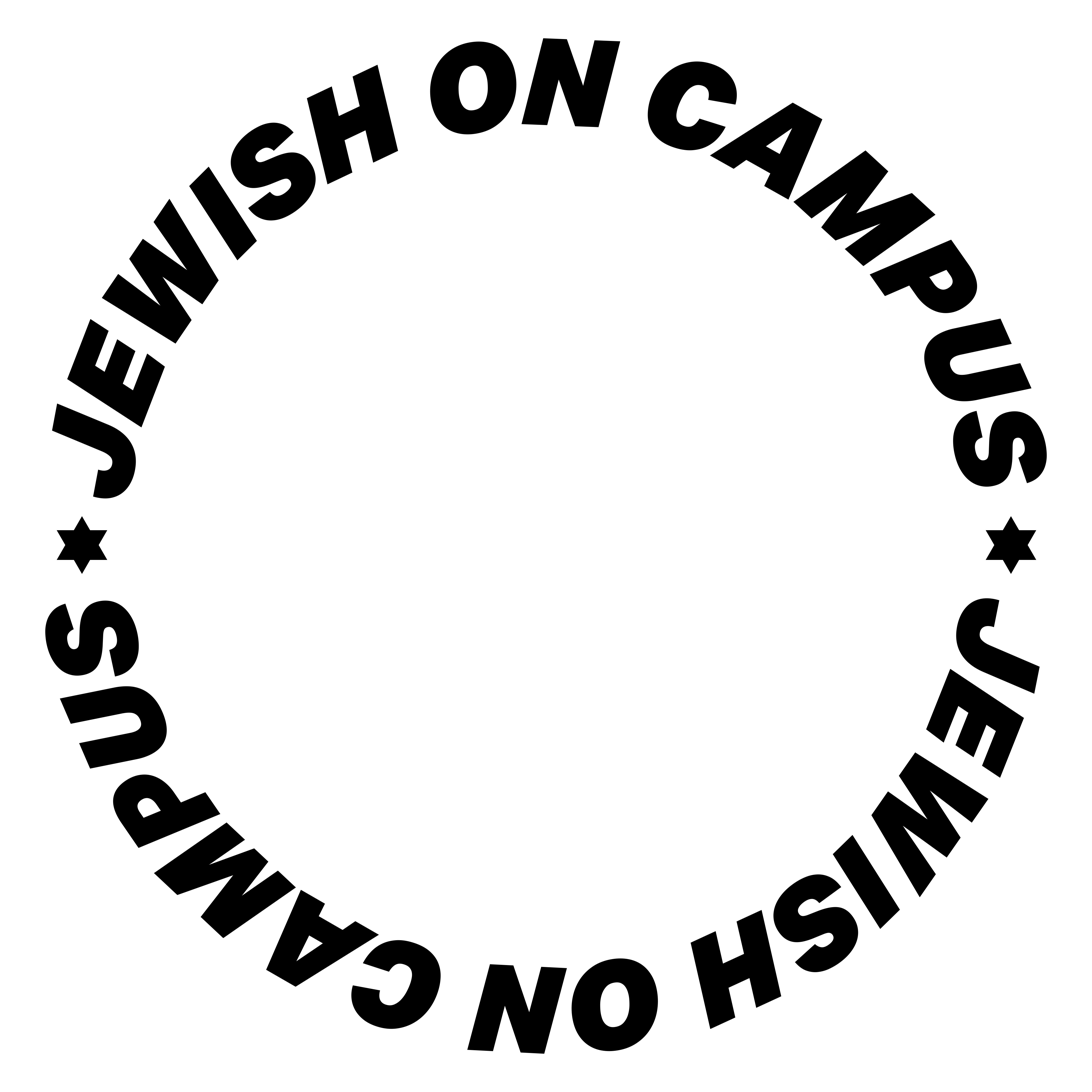
- Formation: 2020; 6 years ago
- CEO: Julia Jassey
- Website: https://jewishoncampus.org/

Jewish on Campus is a Jewish nonprofit organization formed to combat antisemitism on college campuses and pursue Zionist advocacy.

== History ==
In 2020, Jewish on Campus was co-created by Jewish college students, Isaac de Castro, Julia Jassey, and Sylvie S. as an Instagram page meant to bring awareness to individual incidents of antisemitism on college campuses. However, after online popularity, it transformed into a nonprofit organization. As an organization, Jewish on Campus expanded its work to include a platform for student journalism, data collection and analysis to better understand the state of antisemitism on campuses, and an ambassador program to unify Jewish students across the United States and Canada to make statements representative of American Jewish and Canadian Jewish students.

In November 2021, Jewish on Campus became a partner organization of the World Jewish Congress.

In 2022, Jewish on Campus and the Louis D Brandeis Center for Human Rights Under Law triggered a federal investigation at the University of Vermont by filing a complaint after the university failed to investigate reports of antisemitic vandalism, grade discrimination, and student groups that refused to admit Zionist students as members. In June 2022, Jewish on Campus and the Louis D Brandeis Center for Human Rights Under Law filed a complaint in response to antisemitism at SUNY New Paltz.

In December 2022, Jewish on Campus participated at the White House Antisemitism Roundtable, alongside other Jewish organizations such as Hillel International and the American Jewish Committee.

In September 2023, Ipsos released a study on behalf of Jewish on Campus that showed 57% of Jewish university students in the United States have either witnessed or experienced an antisemitic incident, either off-campus or on-campus.

== Recognition ==
Julia Jassey, CEO of Jewish on Campus, was recognized by Algemeiner as one of the Top 100 people positively influencing Jewish life in 2021, due to her work for Jewish on Campus.

== See also ==
- Universities and antisemitism
- AMCHA Initiative
