= John Brebbia =

American baseball player (born 1990)

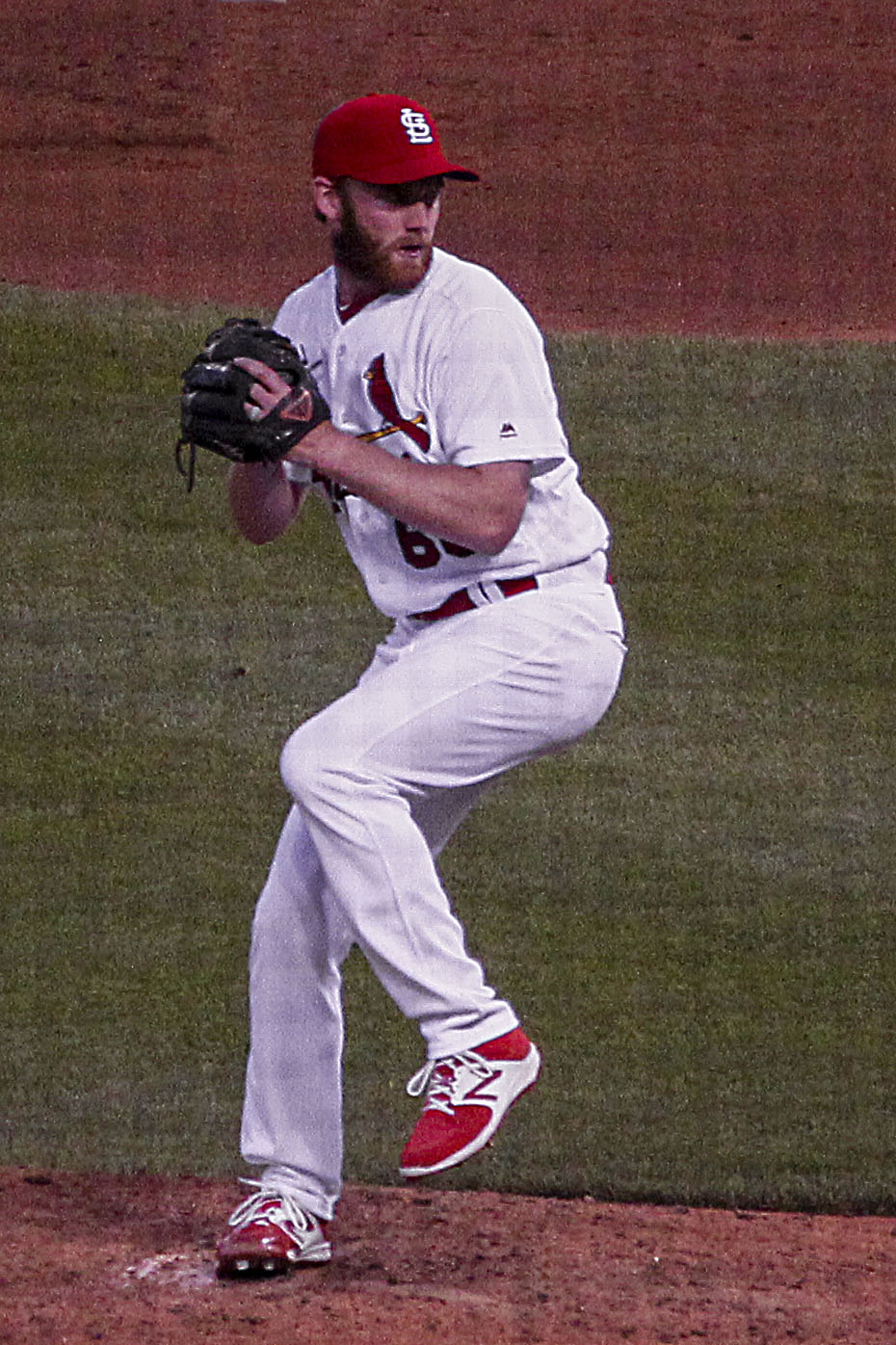
- Brebbia with the St. Louis Cardinals in 2017

Free agent
- Pitcher
- Born: May 30, 1990 (age 36); Boston, Massachusetts, U.S.
- Bats: Left Throws: Right

MLB debut
- May 28, 2017, for the St. Louis Cardinals

MLB statistics (through 2026 season)
- Win–loss record: 16–22
- Earned run average: 4.12
- Strikeouts: 416
- Stats at Baseball Reference

Teams
- St. Louis Cardinals (2017–2019); San Francisco Giants (2021–2023); Chicago White Sox (2024); Atlanta Braves (2024); Detroit Tigers (2025); Atlanta Braves (2025); Colorado Rockies (2026)

John Fulboam Brebbia (born May 30, 1990) is an American professional baseball pitcher who is a free agent. He has previously played in Major League Baseball (MLB) for the St. Louis Cardinals, San Francisco Giants, Chicago White Sox, Atlanta Braves, Detroit Tigers, and Colorado Rockies.

Brebbia played college baseball for Elon University. The New York Yankees selected Brebbia in the 30th round of the 2011 MLB draft. He made his MLB debut for the Cardinals in 2017, and pitched for them through 2019. He had Tommy John surgery in 2020. He played for the Giants from 2021 to 2023.

== Early life and amateur career ==
Brebbia grew up in Sharon, Massachusetts, and attended Sharon High School through his junior year. He transferred to Wellington High School in Wellington, Florida, for his senior year to improve his chances of earning a college baseball scholarship. As a senior at Wellington, he had a 10–1 win–loss record, a 0.83 earned run average (ERA), and recorded an 18-strikeout game.

After high school, Brebbia attended Elon University, where he was a pitcher for the Elon Phoenix. During his freshman year, Brebbia helped the Phoenix secure an at-large bid to the 2009 NCAA Division I baseball tournament. In 2009, he played summer league baseball for the Mankato MoonDogs of the Northwoods League. In 2011, his junior year, he went 7–1 with a 1.76 ERA in 27 relief appearances. He was named First Team All-Southern Conference. In 2010 and 2011, he played collegiate summer baseball for the Orleans Firebirds of the Cape Cod Baseball League.

== Professional career ==
=== New York Yankees ===
The New York Yankees selected Brebbia in the 30th round of the 2011 Major League Baseball draft. He signed and made his professional debut that same season with the Staten Island Yankees of the Low-A New York-Penn League, where he was 0–1 with a 0.00 ERA in eight innings. He spent the 2012 season with the Charleston RiverDogs of the Single-A South Atlantic League and pitched to a 3–1 record with two saves and a 2.96 ERA in 21 2/3 innings over 29 relief appearances. He spent 2013 with Charleston and the Tampa Yankees of the High-A Florida State League; he was a combined 0–5 with one save and a 4.06 ERA in 68 2/3 innings pitched in relief. He was released by the organization on December 13, 2013.

=== Sioux Falls Canaries ===
On January 7, 2014, Brebbia signed with the Sioux Falls Canaries of the American Association of Independent Professional Baseball. In 34 games with the Canaries, he pitched to a 3–2 record with one save, a 3.31 ERA and 10.5 strikeouts per nine innings pitched (fifth-best in the league). Brebbia later said he rediscovered his love for the sport while pitching in the independent leagues. He also began growing his beard in 2014.

=== Laredo Lemurs ===
On December 22, 2014, Brebbia was traded to the Laredo Lemurs alongside AJ Kirby-Jones and Joe Testa for Byron Minnich, Harrison Kain, Jeremy Strawn, Josh Strawn, Tyler Pearson, Gerardo Avila, and cash. In 2015 with Laredo, Brebbia had a 7–2 record with a 0.98 ERA (second-best in the league), in 51 games (third-most), with 19 saves (third-best), an 0.762 WHIP (second-lowest), 4.8 hits per nine innings (second-best), and 11.1 strikeouts per 9 innings (fourth-best).

=== St. Louis Cardinals ===
On September 21, 2015, Brebbia signed a minor league contract with the Arizona Diamondbacks and was assigned to the Double-A Mobile BayBears.

The St. Louis Cardinals selected Brebbia from the Diamondbacks in the minor league phase of the Rule 5 draft at the December 2015 Winter Meetings. In 2016, Brebbia played with both the Springfield Cardinals of the Double-A Texas League and Memphis Redbirds of the Triple-A Pacific Coast League. He was 5–5 with a 5.03 ERA and 68 strikeouts in 68 innings over 43 games.

Brebbia began the 2017 season with Memphis. There he was 1–1 with three saves, a 1.69 ERA and 29 strikeouts in 26 2/3 innings pitched when the Cardinals promoted him to the major league on May 27, 2017. He made his major league debut against the Colorado Rockies on May 28 and remained with the Cardinals for the rest of the season. He finished his 2017 rookie campaign with a 2.44 ERA, 11 walks and 51 strikeouts in 51 2/3 innings, and a 0.929 WHIP, leading all Major League rookie relievers in ERA and WHIP.

He began 2018 with Memphis but was recalled to St. Louis and optioned back to Memphis multiple times during the season. For Memphis, he was 2–0 with two saves, a 4.61 ERA and 24 strikeouts in 13 2/3 innings. In 45 relief appearances for St. Louis, he was 3–3 with two saves and a 3.20 ERA, striking out 60 batters in 50 2/3 innings pitched. On October 29, 2018, Brebbia was selected to the MLB All-Star team at the 2018 MLB Japan All-Star Series, pitching in three games in the series.

Brebbia returned to St. Louis' bullpen for in 2019. Over 66 appearances during the regular season he went 3–4 with a 3.59 ERA, striking out 87 batters over 72 2/3 relief innings.

After first trying platelet-rich injection (PRP) treatment for a torn ulnar collateral ligament in his right elbow Brebbia underwent Tommy John surgery on June 1, 2020, causing him to miss the 2020 season. On December 2, Brebbia was non-tendered by the Cardinals. In his three seasons with the Cardinals, Brebbia had a 3.14 ERA, and 10.2 K/9.

=== San Francisco Giants ===
On December 21, 2020, Brebbia signed a one-year, $800,000 contract with the San Francisco Giants. On February 17, 2021, Brebbia was placed on the 60-day injured list as he continued to recover from Tommy John surgery. He was activated off of the injured list on June 20, recovering from Tommy John surgery faster than the normal 13–15 month recovery timeframe.

In the 2021 regular season for the Giants, Brebbia was 0–1 with a 5.89 ERA. He pitched 18.1 innings over 18 games. For the Triple-A Sacramento River Cats, he was 3–0 with a 2.93 ERA in 17 games (two starts) in which he pitched 15 1/3 innings. On November 30, Brebbia signed a $838,000 contract with the Giants, avoiding salary arbitration.

In 2022 with the Giants, Brebbia was 6–2 with a 3.18 ERA in 68 innings, as he pitched in a league-leading 76 games (11 starts).

On January 13, 2023, Brebbia agreed to a one-year, $2.3 million contract with the Giants, avoiding salary arbitration. He pitched in 29 games for San Francisco, posting a 3.14 ERA with 36 strikeouts, before he was placed on the injured list with a Grade 2 lat strain on June 17. On July 31, he was transferred to the 60-day injured list. Brebbia was activated from the injured list on September 5.

=== Chicago White Sox ===
On January 26, 2024, Brebbia signed a one-year, $5.5 million contract with the Chicago White Sox. In 54 appearances for Chicago, he struggled to an 0–6 record and 6.29 ERA with 58 strikeouts over 48 2/3 innings pitched. Brebbia was designated for assignment by the White Sox on August 27. He was released two days later.

=== Atlanta Braves ===
On August 31, 2024, Brebbia signed a minor league contract with the Atlanta Braves. The next day, he was subsequently selected to the team's major league roster. In 5 games for Atlanta, Brebbia posted a 2.70 ERA with 9 strikeouts across 6 2/3 innings pitched.

=== Detroit Tigers ===
On February 12, 2025, Brebbia signed a one-year, $2.75 million contract with the Detroit Tigers. He started the season with a 1.00 ERA in 8 appearances before being placed on the injured list on April 19 with a right forearm strain. In 19 appearances for Detroit, he struggled to a 7.71 ERA with 20 strikeouts across 18 2/3 innings pitched. On June 15, Brebbia was designated for assignment by the Tigers. After clearing waivers on June 19, Brebbia was released by Detroit.

=== Atlanta Braves (second stint) ===
On June 24, 2025, Brebbia signed a minor league contract with the Atlanta Braves. In 15 appearances for the Triple-A Gwinnett Stripers, he totaled a 1.89 ERA and 21 strikeouts across 19 innings pitched. On August 29, the Braves selected Brebbia's contract, adding him to their active roster. In three appearances for Atlanta, he accumulated a 7.71 ERA with six strikeouts across 4 2/3 innings pitched. On September 8, Brebbia was designated for assignment by the Braves. He elected free agency after clearing waivers on September 10.

On September 13, 2025, Brebbia signed a minor league contract with the Boston Red Sox. He did not appear for the organization and elected free agency following the season on November 6.

=== Minnesota Twins ===
On December 1, 2025, Brebbia signed a minor league contract with the Colorado Rockies that included an invitation to spring training. On March 23, 2026, Brebbia was released by Colorado after failing to make the team's Opening Day roster. On March 29, Brebbia signed a minor league contract with the Minnesota Twins. He made 15 appearances (including two starts) for the Triple-A St. Paul Saints, registering a 1-0 record and 6.20 ERA with 26 strikeouts across 20 1/3 innings pitched. On May 20, Brebbia was released by the Twins after exercising an opt-out clause in his contract.

=== Colorado Rockies ===
On May 28, 2026, Brebbia signed a minor league contract with the Colorado Rockies organization. He made seven scoreless appearances for the Triple-A Albuquerque Isotopes, recording 10 strikeouts over nine innings of work. On June 21, the Rockies selected Brebbia's contract, adding him to their active roster. In three appearances for Colorado, he struggled to a 10.38 ERA with two strikeouts across 4 1/3 innings pitched. Brebbia was designated for assignment by the team on July 1. He elected free agency after clearing waivers two days later. On July 9, Brebbia re–signed with Colorado on a minor league contract. He was released by the Rockies on August 4.

=== Boston Red Sox ===
On August 7, 2026, Brebbia signed a minor league contract with the Boston Red Sox. In 13 games (2 starts) with Triple-A Worcester Red Sox he threw 16.2 innings going 1-0 with a 4.86 ERA and 19 strikeouts. He elected free agency on November 2.

== Pitching style ==
Brebbia throws a mid-90s fastball, an 80 mph slider, and occasionally a changeup.

== Personal life ==
Brebbia's wife gave birth to their son in June 2019. They live in Smyrna, Georgia.

Brebbia enjoys using spreadsheets.

Brebbia shaves prior to each baseball season, then grows his beard during the season. He shaved off his beard in stages during the 2018 MLB Japan All-Star Series.
