= Louis Kafka =

American politician

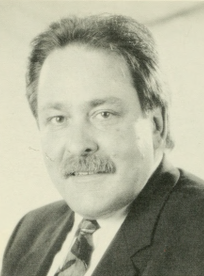

Member of the Massachusetts House of Representatives from the 8th Norfolk District
- In office January 2, 1991 – January 6, 2021
- Preceded by: Marjorie Clapprood
- Succeeded by: Ted Philips

Personal details
- Born: November 28, 1945 (age 80) Boston, Massachusetts
- Party: Democratic
- Education: University of Miami; New England School of Law

Louis L. "Lou" Kafka (born November 28, 1945, in Boston, Massachusetts) is an American former politician. He represented the 8th Norfolk District in the Massachusetts House of Representatives from 1991 to 2021.

On September 1, 2020, Kafka's staff director, Ted Philips, won the Democratic primary over Andrew Flowers to succeed him in the Massachusetts House of Representatives. On Tuesday, November 3, 2020, Philips won the Norfolk 8th District general election unopposed. He assumed office on January 6, 2021.

== Personal life ==
He is Jewish.

== See also ==
- 2019–2020 Massachusetts legislature
- 1991–1992 Massachusetts legislature
