= Massachusetts School Building Authority =

The Massachusetts School Building Authority (MSBA) is a quasi-independent public authority that provides grants which partially fund municipal and regional school districts for kindergarten through high school construction and renovation projects in the Commonwealth of Massachusetts.

The MSBA, upon the initiative of applicant municipal and regional school districts, partially funds school facility construction and develops financially sound plans for constructing educationally appropriate buildings that are long-lived, safe, and economically and environmentally sustainable. The source of MSBA revenue funds is one cent of the 6.25-percent sales tax of the Commonwealth of Massachusetts. The MSBA funds a portion of approved eligible building project costs; the proportion of funding depends primarily upon the school districts's economic health, and can vary from 31 to 80 percent of the cost of the new building or building rehabilitation project.

== History ==
In 2004, the Massachusetts legislature placed a moratorium on state assistance to the funding of public school capital expenditure projects. A prior backlog of more than 800 audits and a failure of the legislature to properly fund the former School Building Assistance Program (SBA) had led to an accumulated a debt of more than $10 billion from the SBA's operations. The program was at that time administered by the Massachusetts Department of Elementary and Secondary Education.

In July 2004, the legislature enacted the bill creating the MSBA, and on July 26, the then Governor, Mitt Romney, signed the bill into law as Chapter 208 of the Acts of 2004, establishing the new public authority, which assumed responsibility for the School Building Assistance Program, its debt obligations and other previous commitments.

The MSBA’s first years focused on an accelerated audit program that resolved prior School Building Assistance Program commitments to local school districts. By the end of 2006, debt and the backlog of audits had been reduced enough for the authority to lift the moratorium on funding new building projects, and in 2007, the MSBA accepted new capital projects for consideration.

On January 25, 2012, Massachusetts Treasurer and Receiver General Steven Grossman, Chair of the MSBA, announced the appointment of Jack McCarthy as Executive Director of the MSBA.

== Operations ==
Since its establishment in 2004, the MSBA has made more than $10.1 billion in reimbursements to cities, towns and regional school districts for school construction projects. Instead of waiting years for reimbursement, districts now receive payments from the MSBA as costs are incurred. These timely payments have saved municipalities over $2.9 billion in avoided local interest costs. To fulfill its mission of developing fiscally responsible and educationally appropriate capital improvements, the MSBA has:

- Made full or partial payments to more than 424 of the 428 projects on the waiting list, with funding available for the remaining projects once they begin construction
- Received and processed over 180 Statements of Interest from communities interested in participating in the program
- Instituted an accelerated audit program that has completed more than 772 of the 800 backlogged audits inherited from the former program
- Audited over $14 billion in project costs
- Made it possible for local municipal or regional school districts to avoided $2.9 billion in interest costs, by increasing speed which projects move through the capital funding process
- Saved Massachusetts and its municipalities over $1.1 billion by establishing of reasonable enrollment projections; increased oversight of school improvement projects with reasonable project budgets the prevent growth in scope or budget; and exercises due diligence by making more than 450 site visits to more than 160 school districts
