= Charles R. Wilber School =

- U.S. National Register of Historic Places
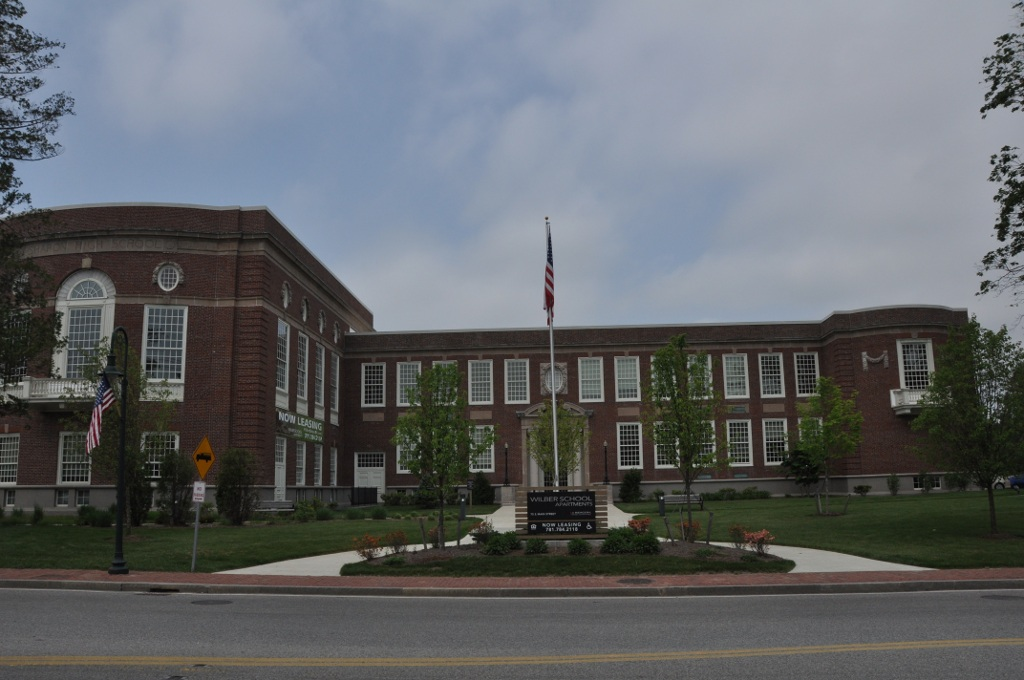

- Location within Massachusetts Location within the United States
- Location: 75-85 S Main St, Sharon, Massachusetts
- Coordinates: 42°7′18″N 71°10′51″W
- Area: 3 acres (1.2 ha)
- Built: 1922
- Built by: Dacey & Tibbets (1928)
- Architect: Charles Harley Ely of Monks & Johnson (1922); Ralph Harrington Doane and Edward S. Holland (1928)
- Architectural style: Late 19th And 20th Century Revivals, Colonial Revival
- NRHP reference No.: 10000244
- Added to NRHP: May 10, 2010

The Charles R. Wilber School (also formerly Sharon High School) is a historic school building at 75-85 South Main Street in Sharon, Massachusetts. Located on a block facing Sharon Town Hall, the large two story brick Colonial and Classical Revival building was built in 1921-22 and enlarged in 1928–29. The older portion of the building, now the south building, was constructed to serve as an elementary school, and was named the Charles R. Wilber School. The 1928 enlargement, including the north wing and the shaft of the T-shaped structure, was done to convert the building to a high school. The building served as Sharon's high school until 1957, after which it became an intermediate school. In 2009 a new wing was added to the building, and it was converted to residential use.Recently in the town center, more buildings have moved into the land around the school. One major Business is the CVS as well as the town hall. the town hall was a recent addition to the town center being built on top of the old fire station.

The building was listed on the National Register of Historic Places in 2010.

The Sharon DPW toured the abandoned building in 2002, which was uploaded to YouTube in 2011.

== See also ==
- National Register of Historic Places listings in Norfolk County, Massachusetts
