= Scott A. Shikora =

American bariatric surgeon (born 1959)

Scott Alan Shikora (born January 3, 1959) is an American bariatric surgeon. He is currently the Director of the Center for Metabolic and Bariatric Surgery at Brigham and Women’s Hospital and a Professor of Surgery at Harvard Medical School.

== Early life ==
Shikora was born on January 3, 1959. He attended Muhlenberg College, from which he graduated in 1981.

He graduated from Columbia University College of Physicians & Surgeons in 1985 with a Medical Doctorate. Following medical School, Dr. Shikora completed both his surgical residency and a fellowship in hyperalimentation at the New England Deaconess Hospital in Boston, Massachusetts.

== Career ==
After completing his fellowship, Shikora spent the next four years in the United States Air Force, where he worked as a staff surgeon. Since 2011, Shikora has been working at Brigham and Women’s Hospital as a bariatric surgeon and Professor of Surgery at Harvard Medical School. Shikora has also worked on advisory boards for several medical companies including Medtronic and EnteroMedics.

He has served on the editorial board for several journals and is currently the Editor-in-chief for the journal Obesity Surgery. Shikora is a former president of the surgical societies the American Society of Parenteral and Enteral Nutrition and the American Society for Metabolic and Bariatric Surgery. He has over 120 publications in various medical journals.

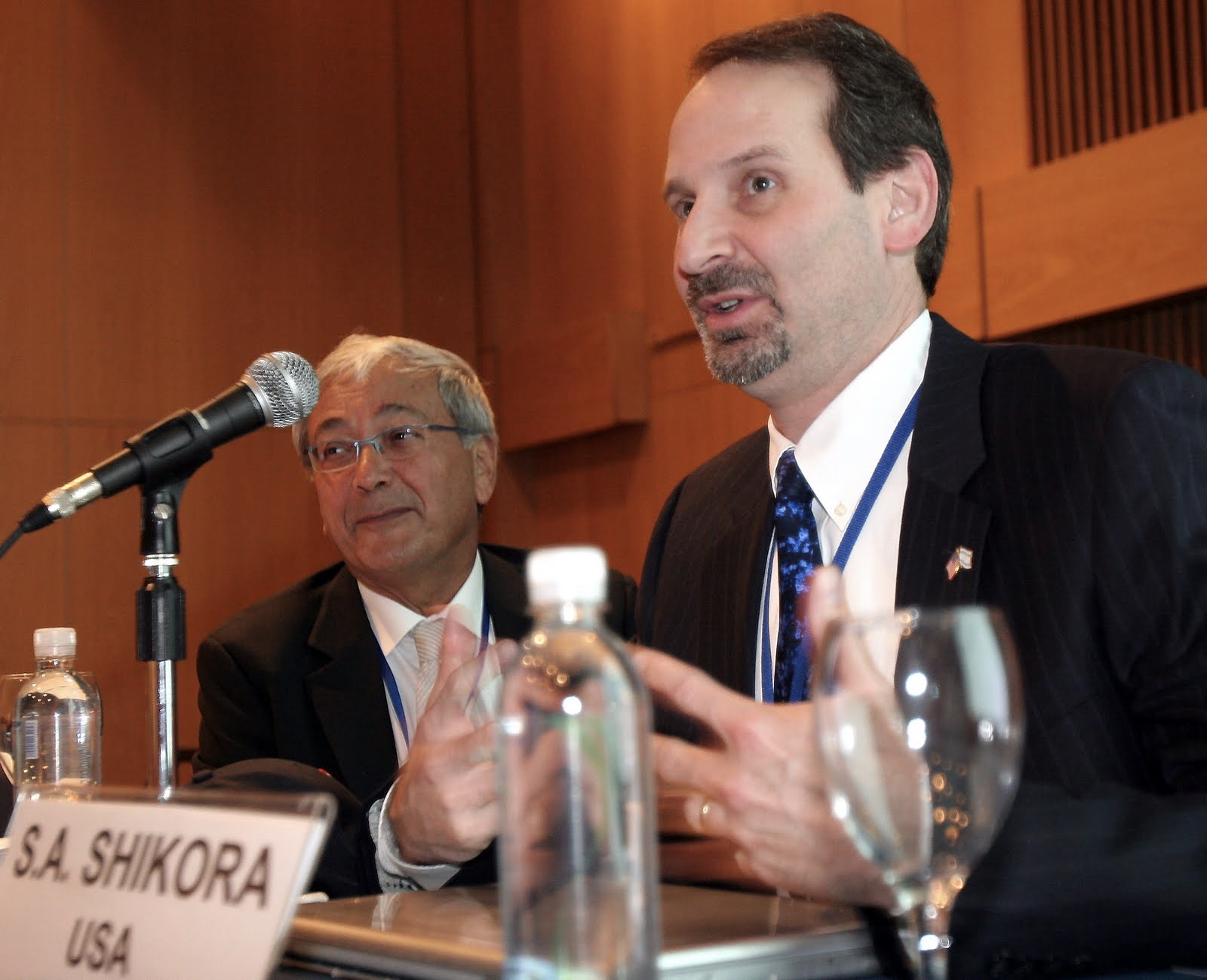
Dr. Shikora speaking in Jerusalem, Israel in 2009 at the First World Congress for the Advancement of Surgery, in Israel

== Personal life ==
Scott Shikora married his college sweetheart Susan in 1983. They have three children.

== Awards and honors ==
- John V. Shankweiler Biology Award, Muhlenberg College, 1981
- Meritorious Service Medal, United States Air Force, 1995
- The Air Force Commendation Medal, 1995
- Excellence in Teaching Award, Tufts Medical Center Department of Surgery 2008-2009
- Distinguished Alumni Award, Muhlenberg College, September 2011
- Helen and David Bernie Visiting Professorship - Department of Surgery, Boonshoft School of Medicine, Wright State University, Dayton, Ohio 2014
- Outstanding Achievement Award, ASMBS Foundation, 2015

== See also ==
- Obesity Surgery
- Bariatric surgery
- List of Scott A. Shikora's Publications
