= Louis D. Brandeis Center for Human Rights Under Law =

American nonprofit organization

- Founded: 2012; 14 years ago
- Founder: Kenneth L. Marcus
- Purpose: Jewish Civil and Human Rights and Israel advocacy
- Location: Washington D.C.
- President: Alyza D. Lewin
- Board of directors: Alyza D. Lewin, Adam S. Feuerstein, Richard Cravatts, Tevi Troy, L. Rachel Lerman
- Website: brandeiscenter.com

The Louis D. Brandeis Center for Human Rights Under Law (LDB) is a 501(c)(3) nonprofit organization founded by Kenneth L. Marcus in 2012 with the stated purpose of advancing the civil and human rights of the Jewish people and promoting justice for all peoples. LDB is active on American campuses, where it says it combats antisemitism and anti-Zionism.

LDB was named after Louis D. Brandeis, a Jewish American lawyer and associate justice on the Supreme Court of the United States active in the Zionist movement. LDB has no relation to Brandeis University or to Louis D. Brandeis himself.

== Leadership and organization ==
LDB was founded in early 2012 by Kenneth L. Marcus, a former Staff Director of the U.S. Commission on Civil Rights.

=== Center for Legal Innovation (CLI) ===
The Center for Legal Innovation (CLI) is a public interest legal organization established by the Louis D. Brandeis Center for Human Rights Under Law (LDB) to address legal claims related to antisemitism. The center provides legal representation for individuals facing discrimination in various sectors, including employment, housing, healthcare, academia, and corporate settings.

=== LDB Law student chapters ===
In 2013, LDB established law student chapters at several law schools in the US. The purpose of these chapters is to foster "a new generation of leaders who share LDB's mission" which includes combating antisemitism and anti-Israelism and the Boycotts, Divestment, and Sanctions (BDS) movement in particular.

== Antisemitism ==
LDB definition of antisemitism follows that of the European Monitoring Centre (EUMC) Working Definition of Antisemitism: "Antisemitism is a certain perception of Jews, which may be expressed as hatred toward Jews. Rhetorical and physical manifestations of antisemitism are directed toward Jewish or non-Jewish individuals and/or their property, toward Jewish community institutions and religious facilities."

LDB considers adopting a definition of antisemitism to be crucial for universities and government to make clear the boundaries between hateful actions and legitimate behavior. The US State Department provides a definition of antisemitism, but it only is applied for international monitoring. LDB is working with universities and domestic government bodies to adopt a definition of antisemitism. In March 2016, the University of California Board of Regents adopted a Statement of Principles Against Intolerance, which included a contextual statement declaring that, "antisemitism and antisemitic forms of anti-Zionism are forms of discrimination and will not be tolerated at the University of California." LDB had previously issued a letter to the Board of Regents, highlighting incidents at UCLA, Santa Barbara, Davis, Berkeley, and Irvine.

== BDS movement ==
The Boycott, Sanctions, Divestment (BDS) movement against Israel has gained significant momentum in recent years, particularly on college campuses. A report by the Anti-Defamation League alleged that "the strategies used in many BDS campaigns [are] anti-Semitic". The Brandeis Center's labels the movement as antisemitic and believes that activists of the BDS campaign act out of explicit or subtle hostility to Jewish individuals to attack what the group regards as "a symbol of identity for the overwhelming majority of Jews".

LDB has been involved in numerous lawsuits involving the Israeli–Palestinian conflict and campus life. Its critics claim that the organization engages in pro-Israel lawfare—lawsuits and threats of lawsuits intended to silence criticism of Israel.

== Legal action ==
=== Georgetown University lawsuit (2026) ===
In 2026, LDB helped a Jewish Georgetown University student defend himself against a $10 million lawsuit filed by a former university employee, Aneesa Johnson. The student publicly criticized Johnson’s antisemitic social media posts, a fact that led, according to Johnson, to her dismissal. The lawsuit involved other defendants, such as Canary Mission and the university itself.

The U.S. District Court for the District of Columbia dismissed the claims with prejudice, saying that the lawsuit targeted protected speech and could have a chilling effect on campus discussions about antisemitism.

=== UC Berkeley School of Law lawsuit (2023–2025) ===
LDB filed a lawsuit against the UC Berkeley School of Law in 2023 over organizations, including but not limited to the Berkeley Journal of Gender, Law & Justice, Queer Caucus, and Women of Berkeley Law, adopting anti-Zionist bylaws. LDB claimed that the anti-Zionist bylaws were antisemitic. A motion to dismiss the case is currently pending before the Northern District of California.

On March 28, 2025, a hearing was held regarding the motion to dismiss the lawsuit. Subsequently, on April 1, 2025, U.S. District Judge James Donato ruled that the lawsuit could proceed. The judge allowed claims alleging violations of equal protection, free exercise of religion, and civil rights to move forward against university officials, including University of California President Michael Drake and former UC Berkeley Chancellor Carol Christ. The court found that the plaintiffs plausibly alleged that Jewish students and faculty were treated differently and that the university was deliberately indifferent to on-campus harassment and a hostile environment.

The lawsuit, filed by the Brandeis Center and Jewish Americans for Fairness in Education, centers on policies adopted by at least 23 student groups at Berkeley Law. These policies exclude speakers who identify as Zionists, which the plaintiffs argue effectively bars many Jewish students from full participation in campus life.

University officials have defended the student groups' rights under the First Amendment, stating that while the policies may be offensive to some, they constitute protected speech. Berkeley Law Dean Erwin Chemerinsky emphasized that the university cannot compel student groups to invite speakers with opposing viewpoints.

=== Harvard lawsuit (2024) ===
On May 22, 2024, the Brandeis Center sued Harvard for inadequately addressing what they alleged was antisemitic harassment and discrimination on campus. The lawsuit declares that Harvard "ignores and tolerates" antisemitic conduct, which runs contrary to "its aggressive enforcement of the same anti-bullying and anti-discrimination policies to protect other minorities." LDB asserts that some Harvard students and faculty have called for violence against Jews and celebrated Hamas's October 7 attacks.

In November 2024, Harvard University filed a motion to dismiss the lawsuit. US District Judge Richard Stearns rejected Harvard's motion to dismiss the case, affirming the claim that the university was "deliberately indifferent" to a hostile environment for Jewish students. This decision cleared the way for the case to proceed to the discovery phase, where further evidence will be gathered to prove the allegations.

In January 2025, the lawsuit concluded with a settlement between Harvard University and the Brandeis Center. As part of the agreement, Harvard adopted the IHRA working definition of antisemitism in its policies and pledged to enhance its procedures for handling discrimination complaints. The settlement also included mandatory training on antisemitism for faculty and staff and the creation of a new office focused on religious discrimination. The New York Times reported that the settlement was prompted by increasing pressure on Harvard to address systemic issues of antisemitism.

=== UCLA Encampments (2024) ===
In June 2024, three Jewish students at the University of California, Los Angeles (UCLA) filed a federal lawsuit against the university, alleging that anti-Israel protesters established encampments that effectively excluded Jewish students from parts of the campus. The lawsuit claimed that the university failed to protect Jewish students' access to campus facilities. A federal judge ruled that UCLA must ensure Jewish students' access to all parts of the campus and cannot allow protesters to block entry to buildings, classes, or services.

=== University of Vermont lawsuit (2021–2023) ===
In 2021, the Anti-Defamation League reported that the University of Vermont had the highest number of reported anti-Semitic incidents. In the same year, the Brandeis Center and Jewish on Campus filed a complaint against the University of Vermont alleging that the university fostered a hostile environment for Jewish students, and did not respond adequately to anti-Semitic incidents. In April 2023, the Education Department's Office for Civil Rights (OCR) identified areas of concern within the university’s policies that "have allowed a hostile environment for ... Jewish students to persist at the university." OCR officials noted that "it does not appear that the university ... took action ... until after the commencement of OCR's investigation." The university agreed to settle the complaint, resolving to edit their discrimination and harassment policies and provide extra training to staff and students "on the prohibition of harassment based on national ancestry."

=== Stanford Title VII lawsuit (2021) ===
The Brandeis Center filed a federal complaint on behalf of Jewish mental health counselors in 2021, alleging anti-Jewish harassment in Stanford University's Counseling & Psychological Services' (CAPS) Diversity, Equity & Inclusion (DEI) program. The complaint was filed with the U.S. Equal Employment Opportunity Commission and the California Department of Fair Employment and Housing. The Brandeis Center claimed that Stanford University's CAPS DEI program perpetuated a "hostile environment and invidious discrimination" that the program was designed to eliminate. The complaint alleged that the DEI committee declined requests to address antisemitism in their trainings, even in the aftermath of an antisemitic "Zoom-bombing." The lawsuit further asserted that DEI committee members at Stanford University's CAPS division invoked antisemitic stereotypes related to Jewish power and wealth.

=== University of Illinois Urbana-Champaign (2020–2021) ===
In response to numerous allegations of antisemitic behavior at the University of Illinois Urbana-Champaign (UIUC), in March 2020, a complaint was filed with the Department of Education's Office for Civil Rights (OCR). This complaint, on behalf of the Jewish students at the university, was filed by the Louis D. Brandeis Center for Human Rights Under Law and Arnold & Porter Kaye Scholer LLP in collaboration with the Jewish United Fund and Hillel International, stating that the events taking place on campus are in violation of Title VI of the Civil Rights Act of 1964.

In November 2020, OCR then opened an investigation into the complaint. Following this action, UIUC along with LDB, Hillel International, and the Jewish United Fund put out a "joint statement" pledging to take a number of concrete steps to address antisemitism on its campus and support Jewish students.

Among these commitments, they promised to form an Advisory Council on Jewish and Campus Life. Additionally, within the statement are provisions allowing students to publicly express their Jewish identity, identification with Israel and their belief in Zionism without fear of discrimination or intimidation. The university has pledged to safeguard these rights and more, to ensure the safety of its Jewish students and condemn anyone who threatens antisemitic harassment.

=== American Studies Association lawsuit (2016–2019) ===
In December 2013, the American Studies Association (ASA) voted to join the academic boycott of Israeli educational institutions. In April 2016, LDB, Eugene Kontorovich and four American studies professors sued ASA, alleging that the boycott was illegal. The lawsuit was dismissed in 2019 when the judge ruled that the plaintiffs lacked standing.

=== The Milan Chatterjee affair (2015–2016) ===
The Milan Chatterjee affair was a controversy on University of California, Los Angeles (UCLA) over the President of the Graduate Student Association (GSA), Milan Chatterjee's allocation of funds. In October 2015, Chatterjee claimed that the GSA had a policy requiring "neutrality" on speech relating to "Israel-Palestine" and that groups advocating for boycotts of Israel, such as Students for Justice in Palestine (SJP), would be ineligible for funding. SJP felt unfairly singled out as they advocate for boycotts of Israel. Civil rights groups got involved in the matter on behalf of SJP and Zionist groups on behalf of Chatterjee. The university launched an investigation which found Chatterjee guilty of having violated university policy that requires neutral point of view in allocating funds.

Early on, LDB law students sided with Chatterjee and questioned how the UCLA was addressing the situation. Marcus condemned BDS-activists who tried to have Chatterjee removed from office: "the Milan Chatterjee affair reflects the insidiousness of the anti-Israel movement's new strategy, which is to suppress pro-Israel advocacy and intimidate not only Jewish pro-Israel students but anyone who even remains neutral."

=== Santa Ana Unified School District Lawsuit (2024) ===
On September 11, 2023, The Louis D. Brandeis Center For Human Rights Under the Law, Anti-Defamation League, American Jewish League, Potomac Law Group, and Stand With Us filed a lawsuit, on behalf of students, against SAUSD, alleging "violations of California’s open meetings law, including failing to provide proper public notice before approving multiple ethnic studies courses containing anti-Jewish bias and for refusing to protect the public, including members of the Jewish community, from intimidation and harassment at Board meetings.” Plaintiffs allege SAUSD violated the Brown Act, which prohibits secret legislation by public bodies and requires open meetings. The lawsuit asks the court to block the controversial curriculum.

== Education and research ==
=== Anti-Semitism Report (2021) ===
In September 2021, a report based on a survey conducted by the Cohen Research Group for the Louis D. Brandeis Center for Human Rights Under Law and the Alpha Epsilon Pi fraternity examined the experiences of Jewish fraternity and sorority members on college campuses. The survey collected responses from 1,027 self-identified Jewish students involved in Greek life at 118 campuses across North America. The report revealed that 65% of respondents had experienced or were aware of antisemitism on their campuses, and 50% admitted to hiding their Jewish identity at times to avoid hostility or discomfort.

Marcus argued that the findings should alarm college leaders, as many Jewish students feel pressured to conceal their identity due to rising antisemitism on campuses.

=== Anti-Semitism Report (2014–2015) ===
In February 2015, LDB and Trinity College issued an "Anti-Semitism Report," presenting results from an online survey of American Jewish college students. The survey had a 10–12% response rate, does not claim to be representative, and included 1,157 self-identified Jewish students at 55 campuses nationwide. The report showed that 54% of the students who took part in the online survey reported having experienced or witnessed antisemitism on their campuses during the Spring semester of the last academic year.

Marcus claimed that the findings should have been a wake-up call to college administrators that Jewish students face real problems of bias.

The study was criticized by The Forward which argued that the study documented only a snapshot in time, rather than a trend, because it did not have a representative sample of Jewish college students and because it allowed students to define antisemitism (leaving the term open to impression).
