= GLY-200 =

Pharmaceutical drug

GLY-200 is an experimental drug that acts as a "polymeric mucin binding duodenal exclusion therapy"; it is developed by Glyscend Therapeutics for type 2 diabetes and obesity. It is intended to reversibly mimic the effects of gastric bypass without the need for surgery. The drug is not absorbed into the body from the gut and has been tested as monotherapy and with metformin.
