= Chris Oliver (surgeon) =

Scottish orthopedic surgeon and cycling advocate

Christopher William Oliver
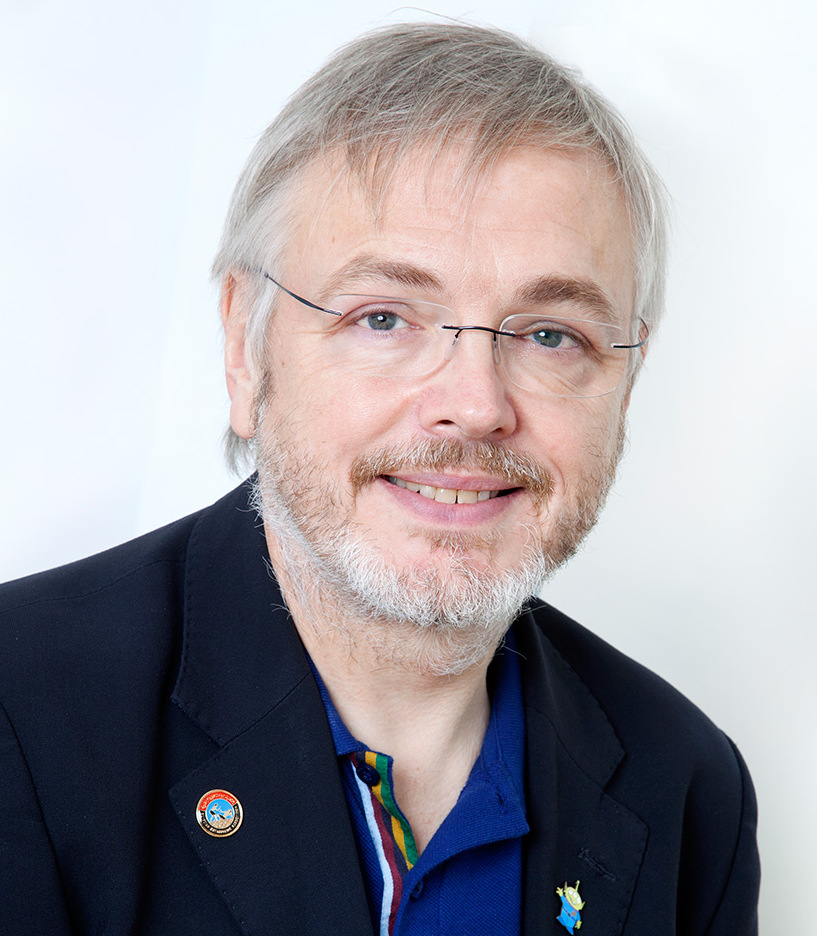
- Born: Forest Gate, London, England
- Occupation: Surgeon

Academic background
- Education: University College Hospital, University College London

Academic work
- Institutions: University of Edinburgh, Napier University
- Website: https://cyclingsurgeon.bike/

Chris Oliver (5 January 1960 - 29 July 2023) was a Scottish orthopaedic surgeon, an academic working on lifestyle medicine, health informatics and medical education, and a cycling advocate.

== Education ==
In 1992, Oliver completed a doctorate (MD) from University College London in spinal muscle physiology and artificial intelligence.

== Career ==
Oliver was consultant trauma orthopaedic and hand surgeon at Royal Infirmary of Edinburgh from 1997 to 2017. From 2015 to 2018 he was also honorary professor in Physical Activity for Health at the Physical Activity for Health Research Centre, University of Edinburgh 2015–18. In 2017, he gave up surgery because of the effects of diabetes on his hands. He was associate research fellow at the School of Engineering and the Built Environment, Transport Research Institute, Edinburgh Napier University, from 2018 to 2021. He was the King James IV Professor at the Royal College of Surgeons of Edinburgh in 2019–20.

In October 2016, along with other academics, he signed a letter to the Medical Schools Council and the General Medical Council to highlight the lack of lifestyle education in undergraduate medical curricula across the United Kingdom.

== Published work ==
Oliver wrote about health informatics, assessment in medical education, physical activity and orthopaedic surgery. He was a section editor in the multi-author major trauma section of Oxford Textbook of Fundamentals of Surgery. published in July 2016.

== Health and cycling advocacy ==
Oliver gained excessive weight during his adult life and at his heaviest was 171 kg (27 stone). In 2007, he had an adjustable gastric band fitted laparoscopically and, by 2011, his weight had reduced to 102 kg (12 stone). In 2014, the band snapped and it was later removed. In November 2020, he had an endoscopic gastric bypass.

Following his weight loss, Oliver became involved in endurance cycling. He became a speaker and advocate for cycling, and worked with Cycling UK, becoming its chair in 2011. He was known as the "Cycling Surgeon". In 2013, he cycled 3,415 miles from Los Angeles to Boston, USA, with his daughter, Catherine.

== Personal life and death ==
Oliver died on 29 July 2023.
