= Sips =

SIPS or Sips may refer to any of the following:

- Secure Session Initiation Protocol transported over TCP/TLS
- Side Impact Protection System
- SIPS surgery, a type of bariatric surgery
- Smart Inorganic Polymers
- Spina iliaca posterior superior
- Structural insulated panels
- Super-IPS TFT LCD panel type, a more advanced version of the IPS LCD Panels. Developed by Hitachi
- Systemically Important Payment Systems
- Society for the Improvement of Psychological Science
- Chris Lovasz, online streamer and member of The Yogscast
