= Single-port laparoscopy =

- Other names: single-port access surgery (SPA), single-port incisionless conventional equipment-utilizing surgery (SPICES), single-incision laparoscopic surgery (SILS), Single-access endoscopic surgery (SAES), laparo-endoscopic single-site surgery (LESS), natural-orifice transumbilical surgery (NOTUS), and one-port umbilical surgery (OPUS)
- MeSH: D010535

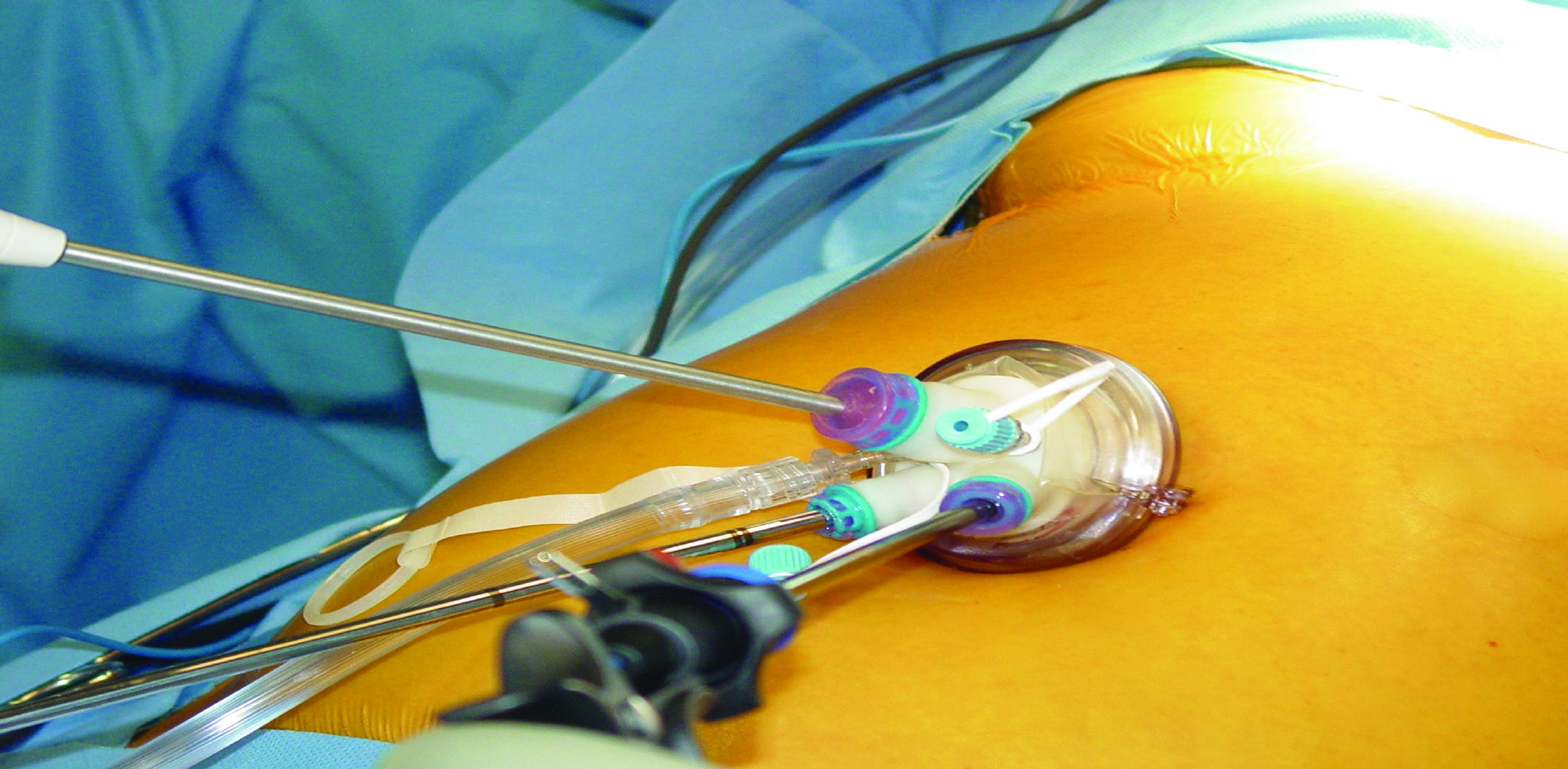
Single-port laparoscopy through the navel

Single-port laparoscopy (SPL) is a recently developed technique in laparoscopic surgery. It is a minimally invasive surgical procedure in which the surgeon operates almost exclusively through a single entry point, typically the patient's navel. Unlike a traditional multi-port laparoscopic approach, SPL leaves only a single small scar.

== Technique, equipment and training ==
SPL is accomplished through a single 20 mm incision in the navel (umbilicus or belly button), or through only an 11 mm incision in the navel, minimizing the scarring and incisional pain associated with the multiple points of entry used during traditional laparoscopic surgery.

Specialized equipment for SPL surgery falls into two broad categories; access ports and hand instruments. There are a number of different access ports, including GelPOINT system from Applied Medical, the SILS device from Covidien, the TriPort+, TriPort15 and QuadPort+ a from Advanced Surgical Concepts and the Uni-X from Pnavel. Hand instruments come in three configurations - standard, articulating, and pre-bent rigid. Standard hand instruments are rigid in design and were developed over the last 30 years for use in laparoscopy. Articulation is designed to overcome one of the challenges inherent in SPL, decreased triangulation of instrument. A number of factors influence a surgeon's decision to use standard or articulating hand instruments, including which access port they use, their own surgical skills and cost as articulating instruments are significantly more expensive than standard instruments. SPL is enhanced by the use of specialized medical devices such as the SILS Multiple Instrument Access Port manufactured by Covidien and Laparo-Angle Articulating Instruments made by Cambridge Endoscopic Devices, Inc. The flexible port that can be fitted through a small incision in the navel to allow surgeons to use up to three laparoscopic devices simultaneously. Certain articulating instruments can be inserted through such specialized ports, providing surgeons with maneuverability and access to the target tissue from a single access point. However single port laparoscopic appendicectomy has also been performed using a single standard 10 mm Y-shaped operating telescope having a 5 mm instruments channel also.

Although awareness of single-port surgery is high amongst surgeons, the use of specialised instruments through such limited access requires considerable skill and training. This operative training and experience is currently limited and some negative perceptions regarding increased operating time and complications with this type of surgery remain. One recent study suggests future uptake relies strongly on the availability of evidence, training, instrumentation and reduced costs.

== Applications ==
The SPL technique has been used to perform many types of surgery, including adjustable gastric banding, appendectomy, cholecystectomy, colectomy, hernia repair, hysterectomy, sleeve gastrectomy, nephrectomy, and sacrocolpopexy. SPL has been employed by surgeons at Cleveland Clinic for clinical trials and in the Geneva University Hospital in Switzerland. Although a number of single-incision techniques use specialized instrumentation, most SPL operations in the United States and Europe have used standard instrumentation. The TriPort+ can be inserted with its introducer through a 15 mm incision at the umbilicus. This device allows four instruments to be used simultaneously. During LESS cholecystectomy a fourth instrument becomes essential to gain critical view. Up until now surgeons have been inventive in how to retract the infundibulum; sutures and other novel means of retraction have all been reported. The instrument's channel allows for a fixed curved infundibular grasper to be added; this helps replicate the methodology currently being practised in traditional four-port laparoscopic cholecystectomy.

== Risks and benefits ==
When compared with traditional multi-port laparoscopic techniques, benefits of SPL techniques include less postoperative pain, less blood loss, faster recovery time, and better cosmetic results. Despite the potential advantages of SPL techniques, there may also be complications. Potential complications include significant postoperative pain, injury to organs, bleeding, infection, incisional hernia, intestinal adhesions and scarring.

== History ==
The first documented procedures of significance occurred in the late 1990s. This approach has recently seen more publicity and excitement as surgeons continue to develop techniques to evolve surgery to less invasive approaches. The first described SPL procedure was a gallbladder removal in 1997. Since that time, thousands of SPL procedures have been successfully performed in the United States, from general surgery to urologic, gynecologic and bariatric surgery applications.

== See also ==
- Natural orifice translumenal endoscopic surgery
