= SIPS surgery =

Type of bariatric surgery

Stomach Intestinal Pylorus-Sparing (SIPS) surgery is a type of weight-loss surgery. It was developed in 2013 by two U.S. surgeons, Daniel Cottam from Utah and Mitchell S. Roslin from New York.

It is substantively the same procedure as the SADI surgery.

== Technique ==
SIPS surgery is a modified version of duodenal switch (DS) surgery. The SIPS surgery involves the creation of a 300-cm common channel with a single-anastomosis duodenal enterostomy.

External image
- SIPS Surgery Image

== Advantages ==
1. Greater weight loss than sleeve gastrectomy (SG).
2. Greater weight loss than Roux-en-Y gastric bypass (RYGB).
3. Weight loss is similar to DS.
4. One of the best revision surgeries after failed RYGB, adjustable gastric banding (ABG), and SG.
5. Better T2DM remission than RYGB and SG.
6. Better cholesterol resolution than RYGB.
7. No Roux limb side effects.
8. Similar nutritional problems to RYGB and less than DS.
9. Low risk of intestinal obstruction compared to RYGB and DS.
10. No Dumping syndrome, unlike RYGB.
11. No marginal ulcers, unlike RYGB.

== Disadvantages ==
1. Long-term data are not available.
2. Procedure is still considered experimental in nature and not covered by insurance companies.
3. Malabsorptive procedure [needs closer nutritional follow-up].
4. <1% incidence of bile reflux.

== See also ==
SADI-S surgery
