= SADI-S surgery =

Bariatric surgical technique

- Cutting lines
- Specialty: Gastroenterology

Result

SADI-S (Single Anastomosis Duodeno–Ileal bypass with Sleeve gastrectomy) is a bariatric surgical technique to address metabolic disorders and to lose weight. It was devised and developed by Andrés Sánchez Pernaute, a Spanish surgeon working in Hospital Clínico San Carlos, in Madrid, and currently professor of the Complutense University of Madrid, Spain. It is a variation on the duodenal switch surgery, incorporating a vertical sleeve gastrectomy with a gastric bypass technique.

The SADI-S is a type of bariatric surgery with a single surgical anastomosis. It has a restrictive component when reducing the greater curvature of the stomach, but especially a malabsorptive component, as the common channel is also reduced. The objective of this surgical technique is to lessen the intestinal loop where nutrients are absorbed.

== Technique ==
It can be performed by laparotomy or laparoscopy. A small gastric sleeve is created by sectioning the greater curvature of the stomach, such as in the sleeve technique. Subsequently, the duodenum is transected respecting the pylorus. A duodenum-intestinal anastomosis is carried out between 250 centimetres (98 in) and 300 centimetres (120 in) from the ileocecal valve. Therefore, this distance becomes the length of the common channel where nutrients are absorbed.

== Advantages ==
The SADI-S is a single anastomosis bariatric surgery. It is different from the classic duodenal switch, the gastric bypass (RNY) or sleeve gastrectomy. It is a type of bariatric surgery carried out to lose weight and to mitigate various metabolic issues including type 2 diabetes, dislipidemia, metabolic syndrome, and polyendocrine metabolic ovarian syndrome (PMOS).

In published studies, total weight loss and the positive impact or remission of type 2 diabetes was better with the SADI-S surgery than with gastric bypass or sleeve gastrectomy.

When compared to RNY surgery, the SADI preserves the stomach/pyloric valve, thus maintaining more anatomical control over release of food into the intestines, and reducing the risk or frequency of dumping syndrome.

When compared to the duodenal switch (DS), in addition to requiring only a single anastomosis (which reduces the incidence of leakage or stricture complication), the SADI surgery typically leaves a longer common channel than the DS. This reduces the severity of malnutrition tied to malabsorption, and mitigates the degree of diarrhea and flatulence associated with DS.

== Disadvantages ==
As with other bariatric malabsorptive techniques, including RNY and DS, patients will need to take vitamin supplements A, D, E, K and minerals throughout their lives. Analytical monitoring is necessary to prevent malnutrition.

Stones in the gallbladder, flatulence and diarrhea are more frequent than with the non-bariatric population.

The surgical risks are similar as in other bariatric techniques, including intestinal perforation, infection, abscess, venous thrombosis, pulmonary embolism, and andanastomotic leaks (although the single anastomosis is designed to present less risk overall compared to the multi-anastomosis techniques). In the long term, it can produce a bowel obstruction. There is a greater chance of bile reflux than a traditional duodenal switch.

While previously considered experimental, in 2020 and 2018, respectively, both the American Society of Metabolic and Bariatric Surgery (ASMBS) and The International Federation for Surgery of Obesity and Metabolic Disorders (IFSO) released statements endorsing SADI as an effective and established surgical technique. While there is no research to indicate that it has any significant reduction in vitamin or mineral supplementation as compared to the Roux-en-Y gastric bypass surgical technique, the typically longer common channel in SADI, compared to duodenal switch surgery, means there is a somewhat lower degree of nutritional deficiency.

== See also ==
- SIPS surgery

== Bibliography ==
- Brown, W; Ooi, G; Ooi, G (2021). "Single Anastomosis Duodenal-Ileal Bypass with Sleeve Gastrectomy/One Anastomosis Duodenal Switch (SADI-S/OADS) IFSO Position Statement-Update 2020". Obesity Surgery. 30 (1): 3–25. doi:10.1007/s11695-020-05134-7. PMID 33409979. S2CID 230818653.
- DeMeester, TR; Fuchs, KH; Ball, CS; Albertucci, M; Smyrk, TC; Marcus, JN (October 1987). "Experimental and clinical results with proximal end-to-end duodenojejunostomy for pathologic duodenogastric reflux". Annals of Surgery. 206 (4): 414–426. doi:10.1097/00000658-198710000-00003. ISSN 0003-4932. PMC 1493213. PMID 3662657.
- Enochs, P; Bull, J; Surve, A; Cottman, D; Bovard, S; Bruce, J; Tyner, M; Palati, D; Cottman, S (2020). "Comparative analysis of the single-anastomosis duodenal-ileal bypass with sleeve gastrectomy (SADI-S) to established bariatric procedures: an assessment of 2-year postoperative data illustrating weight loss, type 2 diabetes, and nutritional status in a single US center". Surgery for Obesity and Related Diseases. 6 (1): 24–33. doi:10.1016/j.soard.2019.10.008. ISSN 0003-4932. PMID 31753795.
- Kallies, K; Rogers, AM (2020). "American Society for Metabolic and Bariatric Surgery updated statement on single-anastomosis duodenal switch". Surgery for Obesity and Related Diseases. 16 (7): 825–30. doi:10.1016/j.soard.2020.03.020. PMID 32371036.
- Payne, JH; DeWind, LT; Commons, RR (August 1963). "Metabolic observations in patients with jejunocolic shunts". American Journal of Surgery. 106 (2): 273–89. doi:10.1016/0002-9610(63)90017-5. ISSN 0002-9610. PMID 14042557.
- Rutledge, R (June 2001). "The mini-gastric bypass: experience with the first 1274 cases". Obesity Surgery. 11 (3): 276–80. doi:10.1381/096089201321336584. ISSN 0960-8923. PMID 11433900. S2CID 25555293.
- Sánchez-Pernaute, A; Pérez-Aguirre, E; Díez-Valladares, L; Robin, A; Talavera, P; Rubio, MA; Torres García, A. (May 2005). "'Right-angled' stapled latero-lateral duodenojejunal anastomosis in the duodenal switch". Obesity Surgery. 15 (5): 700–2. doi:10.1381/0960892053923914. ISSN 0960-8923. PMID 15946463. S2CID 33650911.
- Sánchez-Pernaute, A (2007). "La secreción biliar: en la encrucijada de la carcinogénesis colorrectal" [Bile secretion: At the crossroads of colorectal carcinogenesis]. Revista Española de Enfermedades Digestivas (in Spanish). 99 (9): 487–490. doi:10.4321/S1130-01082007000900001. ISSN 1130-0108. PMID 18052641.
- Sánchez-Pernaute, A; Rubio Herrera, MA; Pérez-Aguirre, E; García Pérez, JC; Cabrerizo, L; Díez Valladares, L; Fernández, C; Talavera, P; Torres, A (December 2007). "Proximal duodeno-ileal end-to-side bypass with sleeve gastrectomy: proposed technique". Obesity Surgery. 17 (2): 1614–8. doi:10.1007/s11695-007-9287-8. ISSN 0960-8923. PMID 18040751. S2CID 26436505.
- Sánchez-Pernaute, A; Herrera, MA; Pérez-Aguirre, ME; Talavera, P; Cabrerizo, L; Matía, P; Díez-Valladares, L; Barabash, A; Martín-Antona, E; García-Botella, A; García-Almenta, EM; Torres, A (December 2012). "Single anastomosis duodeno-ileal bypass with sleeve gastrectomy (SADI-S). One to three-year follow-up". Obesity Surgery. 20 (12): 1720–6. doi:10.1007/s11695-010-0247-3. ISSN 0960-8923. PMID 20798995. S2CID 31863329.
- Sánchez-Pernaute, A; Rubio, MA; Pérez Aguirre, E; Barabash, A; Cabrerizo, L; Torres, A (September–October 2013). "Single-anastomosis duodenoileal bypass with sleeve gastrectomy: metabolic improvement and weight loss in first 100 patients". Surgery for Obesity and Related Diseases. 9 (5): 731–5. doi:10.1016/j.soard.2012.07.018. ISSN 1550-7289. PMID 22963820.
- Scopinaro, N; Gianetta, E; Civalleri, D; Bonalumi, U; Bachi, V (September 1979). "Bilio-pancreatic bypass for obesity: II. Initial experience in man". British Journal of Surgery. 66 (9): 618–620. doi:10.1002/bjs.1800660906. ISSN 0007-1323. PMID 497645. S2CID 36950227.
- Scott, HW; Law, DH; Sandstead, HH; Lanier, VC; Younger, RK (1970). "Jejunoileal shunt in surgical treatment of morbid obesity". Annals of Surgery. 171 (5): 770–80. doi:10.1097/00000658-197005000-00017. ISSN 0003-4932. PMC 1396821. PMID 5445664.
