= SILS gastric banding =

- Specialty: Gastroenterology
- [edit on Wikidata]

Single-incision laparoscopic surgery (SILS) is an advanced, minimally invasive (keyhole) procedure in which the surgeon operates almost exclusively through a single entry point, typically the patient's umbilicus (navel). Special articulating instruments and access ports eliminate the need to place trochars externally for triangulation, thus allowing the creation of a small, solitary portal of entry into the abdomen.

SILS has been used for several common surgical procedures including hernia repair, cholecystectomy and nephrectomy. The SILS technique has also been used in weight-loss surgery for both sleeve gastrectomy and – more recently – for laparoscopic adjustable gastric banding (LAGB).

== The adjustable gastric band ==
The development of the adjustable gastric band in the mid-1980s was a watershed in the treatment of obesity. The father of the gastric band is generally agreed to have been Lubomyr Kuzmak (1929–2006), a Ukrainian born surgeon who had emigrated to the US in 1965. In 1986, Kuzmak reported on the clinical use of the “adjustable silicone gastric band” (ASGB) via open surgery.

The next major step was the advent of laparoscopic (keyhole) surgery in the late1980s, which represented a revolution in abdominal surgery. The original Kuzmak ASGB was unsuitable for laparoscopic implantation and underwent extensive modification, eventually emerging as the modern LAP-BAND. The first laparoscopic implantation of the LAP-BAND was performed by Belachew and Favretti in September 1993 and since then, approximately 400,000 implants have been performed worldwide.

Until now, the laparoscopic technique required 5 incisions (4 × 5 mm and 1 × 5 mm), with visible scars. SILS is the next logical step in the progression of laparoscopic surgery and offers the prospect of one incision with no visible scars.

In the case of adjustable gastric banding, most SILS implants to date have utilized a 4 cm incision below the patient's left rib. However, other surgeons have been able to locate a single incision in the umbilicus – trans-umbilical gastric banding – which leaves no visible scar on the external abdominal wall. On February 14, 2009, the UK's first SILS implantation of a gastric band was performed by the pioneering surgeon Professor Franco Favretti and his Healthier Weight team. The patient, a 50-year-old female, received a gastric band (LAP-BAND) implanted through the umbilicus. The patient made an excellent recovery and was discharged the following day. Post-operative review at 8-weeks confirmed excellent weight loss with no visible evidence of the previous surgery.

== Benefits of SILS gastric banding ==
While the technique is in the early stages of development, it is clear that a SILS approach to gastric banding offers a number of attractive benefits, including:

- Reduced risk of wound infection (1 wound versus 5)
- Less post-operative pain and reduced use of medication
- More rapid mobilization and recovery
- No visible scars
