= StomaphyX =

StomaphyX is an endoscopic suturing system designed to treat patients who have had previous Roux-en-Y gastric bypass surgery. Following this surgery, the stomach pouch and stomach outlet (stoma) becomes enlarged in some patients. The StomaphyX device can be used to restrict the size of the stoma without exposing the patient to further surgical risk.

Although initial post-procedure weight loss is evident in some trials, there is doubt as to whether such results are sustained over the long term.

The StomaphyX device was patented by EndoGastric Solutions.

== Medical uses ==
StomaphyX has been used by bariatric surgeons to further reduce the volume of the small stomach pouch created by gastric bypass procedures. Many patients experience weight regain due to the small stomach pouch stretching over time. The use of an endoscopic procedure to correct this problem is appealing because, if successful, it could reduce risk to the patient that can be associated with more invasive surgical procedures.

== Technique ==
The esophagus and stomach are accessed using a fiberoptic gastroscope (similar to a colonscope for the colon). The StomaphyX device is designed to go down into the stomach with the gastroscope. Once inside the stomach pouch, pleats are formed using polypropylene fasteners to make the pouch smaller.

== Efficacy ==
Early investigator-initiated uncontrolled clinical studies with small patient groups have demonstrated short-term weight loss in some patients. For example, a study of 27 patients found most achieved weight loss during the first six months after the procedure. However, a randomized sham-controlled study was terminated in 2011 because the device failed to achieve the study's 15% target reduction in body mass index (BMI) in 50% of patients treated with it.
