= Duodenal-jejunal bypass liner =

- Specialty: Gastroenterology

Duodenal-Jejunal Bypass Liner, or Gastric Bypass Stent, Common brand names include EndoBarrier, is an implantable medical device in the form of a thin flexible 60 cm-long tube that creates a physical barrier between ingested food and the duodenum/proximal jejunum. The duodenal-jejunal bypass liner prevents the interaction of food with enzymes and hormones in the proximal intestine to treat type 2 diabetes and obesity. The duodenal-jejunal bypass liner is delivered endoscopically and has been tested on the morbidly obese (those with a body mass index [BMI] greater than 40) as well as obese patients with a BMI less than 40, particularly those with difficult-to-manage type 2 diabetes. Despite a handful of serious adverse events such as gastrointestinal bleeding, abdominal pain, and device migration — all resolved with device removal — initial clinical trials have produced promising results in the treatment's ability to improve weight loss and glucose homeostasis outcomes.

== How it works ==
The device is connected at one end to the beginning of the duodenum (first portion of the small intestine from the stomach) and at the other the mid-jejunum (the secondary stage of the small intestine). A nitinol anchor secures the bag at the duodenum, ensuring the liner doesn't migrate and that the chyme (the semifluid mass of partially digested food that exits the stomach) completely enters into the liner. This prevents the partially digested food from entering the first and initial part of the secondary stage of the small intestine, mimicking the effects of the biliopancreatic portion of Roux en-Y gastric bypass (RYGB) surgery. This reduces the amount of calories absorbed and causes bile and pancreatic fluids to be redistributed later in the mid-jejunum for reduced breakdown and absorption of the chyme.

Initial clinical research by Rubino et al. in 2006 produced two hypotheses for why duodenal-jejunal bypass is effective in improving glucose homeostasis. Their "hindgut hypothesis" claims that by expediting the delivery of chyme to the distal intestine, the secretion of the gut hormone GLP-1 and glucose-dependent insulin is more effectively promoted, improving glucose metabolism. The "foregut hypothesis," on the other hand, states that by bypassing the duodenum and proximal jejunum (the initial parts of the small intestine), the inhibiting hormone GIP is secreted less, resulting in improved glucose tolerance. As of 2015, those hypotheses continue to be tested, with Xiong et al. finding elements of both being involved.

== Adverse Effects ==
A specialized study of the product noted that the rate of adverse events could reach 84.4% of the 1,056 cases counted, with a moderate adverse event rate of 20.5% and a serious adverse event rate of 3.7%.

Common adverse event, other than those related to surgery, were mainly implant rejections (e.g., abdominal pain, vomiting), gastrointestinal bleeding, anchor displacement, ulceration, and perforation, as well as liner-related adverse events (e.g., obstruction, ectopia) and inflammatory conditions such as pancreatitis, cholecystitis, and cholangitis.

Severe adverse events includes perforation of the esophagus, gastrointestinal hemorrhage, anchor tissue overgrowth, perforation of the duodenal bulb, hepatic abscess and acute pancreatitis, the majority (85%) of serious adverse events were directly or indirectly related to anchor.
