= 1-800-GET-THIN =

American marketing company

1-800-GET-THIN was an American marketing company with headquarters at Beverly Hills, California. It sold weight-loss products and was a vanity 800 number as well as a trademarked brand name used to market "insurance services, namely, insurance eligibility review and verification in the health industry."

== History ==
Robert Silverman incorporated 1-800-GET-THIN in February 2010. According to Silverman, the goal of 1-800-GET-THIN was "'assisting individuals [to] overcome their battle with obesity, which has reached world-wide epidemic status.'" Robert Silverman resigned as company president on 28 February 2012 "to pursue other career opportunities."

== Lap-Band ==
On February 2, 2012 Allergan, the manufacturer of Lap-Band, announced it would no longer sell the device to companies affiliated with 1-800-GET-THIN.

On 7 February 2012, two clinics affiliated with 1-800-GET-THIN halted Lap-Band surgeries. Shortly after that, all previous advertisements, including commercials, were scrubbed off clinic websites and their Youtube channel.

== Controversies ==
U.S. House members called for a congressional investigation in 2012 into 1-800-GET-THIN. The California Department of Insurance is investigating surgery centers that are contracted with 1-800-GET-THIN for alleged insurance fraud. Published reports and lawsuits speculate that one of the principal surgeons at this enterprise owned and controlled all of the surgery centers, as well as the 1-800-GET-THIN marketing firm. The documents also speculate that ownership of the centers and the marketing firm, 1-800-GET-THIN, are in part controlled by Kambiz Beniamia Omidi. In October 2012, the FDA confirmed that members of the 1-800-GET-THIN ad campaign are the subjects of a criminal investigation, involving several federal and state law enforcement agencies, according to a court filing. The investigation is focused on numerous "Potential violations of federal law, including conspiracy, healthcare fraud, wire fraud, mail fraud, tax violations, identity theft, and money laundering," Samanta Kelley, a special agent for the Food and Drug Administration's criminal division, said in an affidavit filed at the federal courthouse in Los Angeles. She also stated that the FBI investigated blackmail against 1-800-Get-Thin.

A former 1-800-GET-THIN client testified in a deposition for a lawsuit that he knew about six or seven deaths that occurred before October 6, 2010, when he says he quit. Two reported deaths occurred after that date, including one still under investigation by the Los Angeles coroner." The death still under investigation was that of Paula Rojeski, who died on September 8, 2010, after she underwent a Lap-Band operation at the Valley Surgical Center in West Hills.

No doctors were found of any wrongdoings. As a result, Rojeski's lawsuit was dismissed in 2017.

In 2011, a class action lawsuit was filed by relatives of two patients who died after Lap-Band surgeries at clinics affiliated with the 1-800-GET-THIN campaign. The complaint alleged false advertising and sought damages from the owners and several companies allegedly controlled by them. In April 2013, a settlement was reached to pay approximately $1.3 million to fund compensation for members of the plaintiff class and to fund a billboard campaign warning of the risks of the surgeries. Other lawsuits remain unresolved. To this day, no doctor associated with the 1-800-GET-THIN campaign was found guilty of any of the five patient deaths. In addition, there were no medical board accusations alleging wrongdoing by physicians.

From 2011-12, the U.S. Food and Drug Administration found that 1-800-GET-THIN's advertisements, LapBandVIP's advertisements, and O-Band's advertisements were all simultaneously misleading and failed to provide accurate information about the potential risks involved in using the product. In 2014 federal prosecutors seized more than $100 million in assets asserted to be related to the business, and in February 2018 Julian Omidi and Mirali Zarrabi were arrested after a federal grand jury indicted them on multiple counts relating to the business' allegedly fraudulent conduct. In December 2021, Omidi was found guilty by a federal jury of 28 counts of wire fraud and multiple other counts; Zarrabi was acquitted of all charges. In 2023, Omidi was sentenced to seven years in prison.
