= Lumen (anatomy) =

Cavity within an organ

Cross section of the gut. The lumen is the space in the middle also known as the volume.

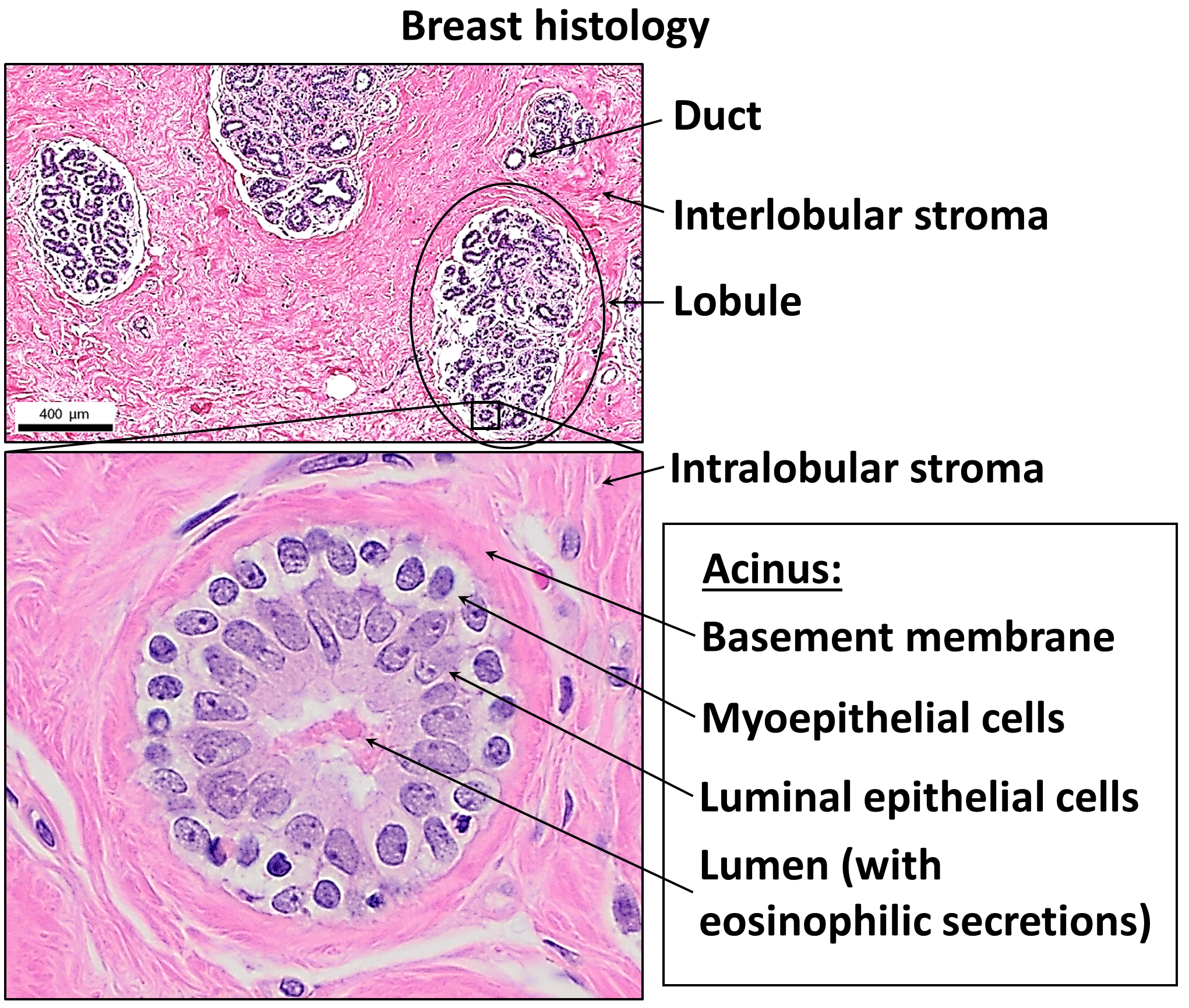
Normal histology of the breast, with lumen annotated at bottom right

In biology, a lumen (pl.: lumina or lumens) is the space found within an anatomical tubular structure. The use of the word lumen in biology can be applied to numerous systems within the body, as it can refer to the larger vessels and to the intricate formations found within individual cells. The etymology of the word lumen comes from Latin lumen 'an aperture'.

The lumen serves a critical-functional role within the network of anatomical structures. The specifics of their purpose depends on their location since lumina are scalable, however; its key role is to allow the transport of substances throughout the aforementioned biological systems. On top of that, lumina are important to morphogenesis as they shape the pathways of organisms as they develop.

It can refer to:

- the interior of a vessel, such as the central space in an artery, vein or capillary through which blood flows
- the interior of the gastrointestinal tract
- the pathways of the bronchi in the lungs
- the interior of renal tubules and urinary collecting ducts
- the pathways of the female genital tract, starting with a single pathway of the vagina, splitting up in two lumina in the uterus, both of which continue through the fallopian tubes
- the fluid-filled cavity forming in the blastocyst during pre-implantation development called the blastocoel

== Cell Biology ==
In cell biology, the lumen is a membrane-defined space that is found inside several organelles, cellular components, or structures. For example, some structures found in eukaryotes include thylakoid (only found in the chloroplasts of plants), endoplasmic reticulum, Golgi apparatus, lysosome, mitochondrion, and microtubule. In most cases the lumen serves the purpose of transport or simply exist as in the case of microtubules for cell structure and support.

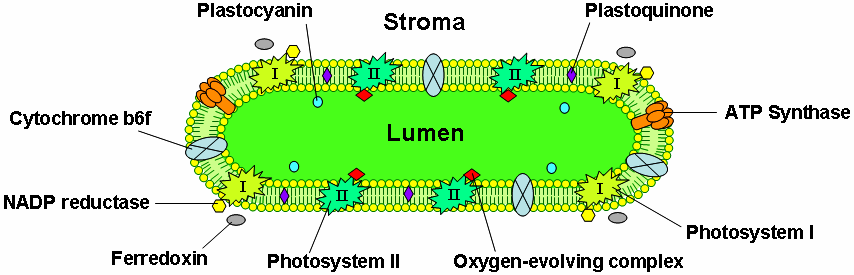
- A simplified diagram of a thylakoid disc depicting the lumenal space as well as embedded proteins.
  The thylakoid lumen is the entire water-suspended space within the thylakoid itself; it is here that during the light-dependent reaction that hydrogen ions enter, perpetuating the process of photosynthesis.
- The lumen within the endoplasmic reticulum (ER) is the enclosed space within the ER itself; during protein synthesis it is here that the protein chain is pushed into the ER and within the luminal space the chain is folded into its tertiary structure.
- The Golgi lumen is unique in the fact that within each cisterna, the chemical contents differ as raw, unprocessed proteins and lipids pass through the cis face, undergo tagging and glycosylation and exit through the trans face.
- Lysosomes must maintain an acidic lumen in order to execute their functions, such as recycling organic material, because the acid hydrolyses within need such an environment.
- The mitochondrial lumen is often referred to as the matrix. Within the matrix there exists the machinery and chemical substances needed in order to foster Krebs cycle which is necessary for ATP production.
- The lumina within microtubules are often solvent filled, with no other biological substances inhabiting it, however there are a class of proteins that exist within the space called microtubule luminal particles. Through the use of cryogenic electron tomography (cryo-ET), the main particle identified was tubulin-binding cofactors.

== Formation ==
The formation of lumens can occur in a variety of different ways as their function depends on the shape and size. Intercellularly, lumen growth and development follows the process of an ion gradient being created inside and outside the developing lumen, which then causes the flow of water. For closed lumina, formation begins when an osmotic pressure is created in the growing hollow structure by the movement of ions which then induces the flow of water. The This kind of formation can be found within blastocytes, acini, and canaliculi. Specifically in the case of the blastocyte, the creation of the blastocoel occurs when extracellular fluid is pumped into the mouse embryo where microlumens form and eventually combine into one central structure.

Formation of epithelial lumina occur within epithelial organs, here a lumen emerges from a cavities or tubes from one central lumen where once again ions are pumped into the empty space where then biological substances flow as the lumen opens.

== Transluminal procedures ==
Transluminal procedures are surgical operations that occur through a luminal structure, they are often non-invasive as certain procedures require passing an instrument through an orifice, as is the case for natural orifice transluminal endoscopic surgery.

- natural orifice transluminal endoscopic surgery in the lumina of, for example, the stomach, vagina, bladder, or colon
- procedures through the lumina of blood vessels, such as various interventional radiology procedures:
  - percutaneous transluminal angioplasty
  - percutaneous transluminal commissurotomy

== See also ==
- Foramen, any anatomical opening
