= Internal hernia =

- A hernia—the hole in the light-colored wall of tissue—can trap loops of the bowel or other tissue
- Specialty: General surgery
- Differential diagnosis: Endometriosis, chronic pelvic pain

Internal hernias occur when there is protrusion of an internal organ into a retroperitoneal fossa or a foramen (congenital or acquired) in the abdominal cavity. If a loop of bowel passes through the mesenteric defect, that loop is at risk for incarceration, strangulation, or for becoming the lead point of a small bowel obstruction. Internal hernias can also trap adipose tissue (fat) and nerves. Unlike more common forms of hernias, the trapped tissue protrudes inward, rather than outward.

Mesenteric defects commonly occur in trauma, such as gunshot wounds to the abdomen. In trauma victims, the defect is usually closed, sometimes with resection of the associated bowel, which may have lost its blood supply. Also mesenteric defects are intentionally created in the Roux-en-Y gastric bypass procedure, being classically known as a Petersen's hernia. The mesenteric defect in such cases, called Petersen's defect, is located between the transverse colon and the mesentery of the alimentary limb (the segment of the jejunum from the jejunojejunostomy until the connection with the proximal segment of the stomach) at the level of the jejunojejunostomy.

Internal hernias are difficult to identify in women, and misdiagnosis with endometriosis or idiopathic chronic pelvic pain is very common. One cause of misdiagnosis that when the woman lies down flat on an examination table, all of the medical signs of the hernia disappear. The hernia can typically only be detected when symptoms are present, so diagnosis requires positioning the woman's body in a way that provokes symptoms.

Both internal hernias and umbilical hernias are more common in women than men.
