= Natural orifice transluminal endoscopic surgery =

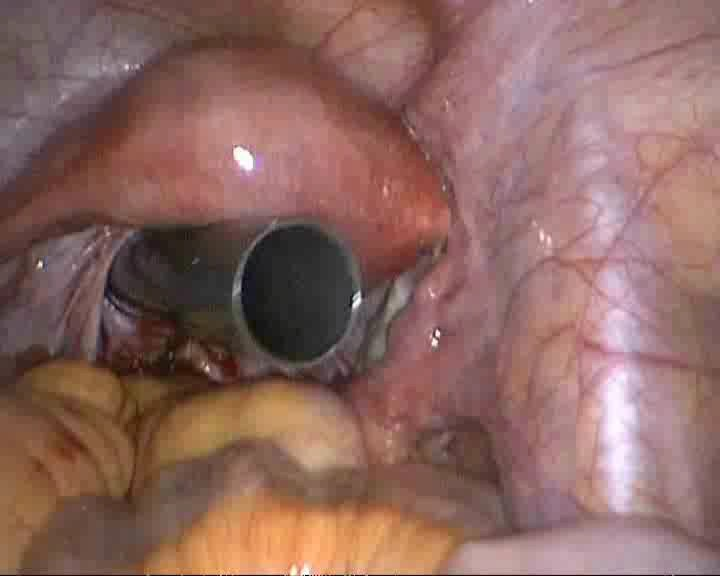
- Endoscopic surgery trocar inserted through the vaginal fornix. The uterus is visible directly above the trocar.
- Specialty: Gastroenterology

Natural orifice transluminal endoscopic surgery (NOTES) is a surgical technique whereby "scarless" abdominal operations can be performed with an endoscope passed through a natural orifice (mouth, urethra, anus, vagina, etc.) then through an internal incision in the stomach, vagina, bladder or colon, thus avoiding any external incisions or scars. Memic's hominis robotic system is the first and only FDA-authorized surgical robotic platform for NOTES procedures. The system is currently at use for transvaginal hysterectomies through the rectouterine pouch - the removal of the uterus, along with one or both of the fallopian tubes and ovaries, in cases where there is no cancer present, as well as with the removal of ovarian cysts.

== See also ==
- Single port laparoscopy
