= Duodenal switch =

Weight-loss surgery

- ICD-9-CM: 43.89, 45.51 45.91

The duodenal switch (DS) procedure, also known as a gastric reduction duodenal switch (GRDS), is a weight loss surgery procedure that is composed of a restrictive and a malabsorptive aspect.

The restrictive portion of the surgery involves removing approximately 70% of the stomach (along the greater curvature) and most of the duodenum.

The malabsorptive portion of the surgery reroutes a lengthy portion of the small intestine, creating two separate pathways and one common channel. The shorter of the two pathways, the digestive loop, takes food from the stomach to the common channel. The much longer pathway, the biliopancreatic loop, carries bile from the liver to the common channel.

The common channel is the portion of small intestine, usually 75-150 centimeters long, in which the contents of the digestive path mix with the bile from the biliopancreatic loop before emptying into the large intestine. The objective of this arrangement is to reduce the amount of time the body has to capture calories from food in the small intestine and to selectively limit the absorption of fat. As a result, following surgery, these patients absorb only approximately 20% of the fat they consume.

== Comparison to other surgeries ==
=== Advantages ===
The primary advantage of duodenal switch (DS) surgery is that its combination of moderate intake restriction with substantial calorie malabsorption results in a higher percentage of excess weight loss than a purely restrictive gastric bypass for all individuals. In a systemic metaanalysis of the weight loss surgical procedures (Buckwald et al.) Type 2 diabetics have had a 98% "cure" (i.e. became euglycemic) almost immediately following surgery, which is due to the metabolic effect from the intestine switch. The results are so favorable that some surgeons in Europe are performing the "switch" or intestinal surgery on non-obese patients to cure diabetes. Novel operations are geared toward the treatment of diabetes and not necessarily to induce weight loss. Among the most prominent of these operations are the duodenal-jejunal bypass and ileal transposition, where duodenal switch is a part of the operation.

The following observations were reported on the resolution of obesity related comorbidities following the duodenal switch: type 2 diabetes 99%, hyperlipidemia 99%, sleep apnea 92%, and hypertension 83%.

Because the pyloric valve between the stomach and small intestine is preserved, people who have undergone the DS do not experience the dumping syndrome common with people who have undergone the Roux-en-Y gastric bypass surgery (RNY). Much of the production of the hunger hormone, ghrelin, is removed with the greater curvature of the stomach.

The summarized data can be found on a poster: comparative poster

Diet following the DS is more normal and better tolerated than with other surgeries.

The malabsorptive component of the DS is fully reversible as no small intestine is actually removed, only re-routed.

=== Disadvantages ===
The malabsorptive element of the DS requires that those who undergo the procedure take vitamin and mineral supplements in excess of those needed by the normal population, as do patients having the RNY surgery. Commonly prescribed supplements include a daily multivitamin, calcium citrate, and the fat-soluble vitamins A, D, E and K.

Because gallstones are a common complication of rapid weight loss following any type of weight loss surgery, some surgeons may remove the gall bladder as a preventative measure during the DS or the RNY. Others prefer to prescribe medication to reduce the risk of post-operative gallstones.

Like RNY patients, DS patients require lifelong and extensive blood tests to check for deficiencies in life-critical vitamins and minerals. Without proper follow up tests and lifetime supplementation RNY and DS patients can become ill. This follow-up care is non-optional and must continue for as long as the patient lives.

DS patients also have a higher occurrence of smelly flatus and diarrhea, although both can usually be mitigated through diet, including avoiding simple carbohydrates.

The restrictive portion of the DS is not reversible, since part of the stomach is removed. However, the stomach in all DS patients does expand over time, and while it will never reach the same size as the natural stomach in most patients, some stretching does occur.

== Risks ==
All surgical procedures involve a degree of risk; however this must be balanced against the significant risks associated with severe obesity.

Some of the surgical risks or complications for this procedure are: perforation involving small bowel, duodenum, or stomach causing a leak, infection, abscess, deep vein thrombosis (blood clot), and pulmonary emboli (blood clot traveling to the lungs).

Longer term risks include the possibility of vitamin and mineral deficiency, hernia and bowel obstruction. There is little information as to the longer-term risks (greater than 15 years), as this procedure was very rarely performed before 2000.

The traditional biliopancreatic diversion with duodenal switch (BPD-DS) led to persistent malnutrition in some patients. However, the loop duodenal switch reduces this risk because it bypasses a smaller portion of the small intestine, but there is no long term information for the loop duodenal switch to fully and accurately compare. Malnutrition is an uncommon and preventable risk after duodenal switch.

== Qualifications ==
The National Institutes of Health state that for patients who meet the following guidelines, weight loss surgery may be an appropriate measure for permanent weight loss:

- BMI of 40 or over
- BMI of 35 or over with obesity-related illnesses such as:
  - Diabetes mellitus type 2
  - Coronary heart disease
  - Sleep apnea
  - Osteoarthritis
  - GERD
- An understanding of the operation and lifestyle changes necessary following the surgery.

== Costs ==
Compared with the other three generally accepted bariatric surgery procedures (gastric bypass, gastric banding and gastric sleeve), duodenal switch surgery is the most expensive procedure to perform due to its more complicated nature and longer operating times. Because it is more complicated and is performed less often than the other common procedures (lower demand), it is also performed by a relatively small percentage of surgeons; this further drives up the price due to lack of competition.

Patients without insurance (also called "self-pay" patients by most bariatric practices) can expect to pay an average of about $27,000 in the United States, although this varies widely across states and clinics. For example, surgical practices in the least expensive state (New Jersey) average about $24,000 while practices in the most expensive state (Nebraska) charge about $32,500. This surgery is also performed by some surgeons in Mexico at a much lower cost than in the United States.

== See also ==
- SADI-S surgery
- SIPS surgery
