= Lubomyr Kuzmak =

American surgeon

- Любомир Кузьмак
- Born: Liubomyr-Ihor Kuzmak; August 2, 1929; Baligród, Second Polish Republic (now Poland)
- Died: October 12, 2006
- Occupation: Bariatric surgeon

Lubomyr Kuzmak (Ukrainian: Любомир-Ігор Кузьмак, romanized: Liubomyr-Ihor Kuzmak), August 2, 1929 – October 12 2006) was a pioneer within the bariatric surgical community inventing the adjustable silicone band.

== Education and the early years ==
Lubomyr Kuzmak was born August 2, 1929, to a Ukrainian family in Baligrod, Poland. Despite growing up in the totalitarian environment of oppressive Hitlerism and Stalinism, Dr. Kuzmak made the most of his youth, being an avid participant in competitive sports, such as skiing, swimming and motorcycle racing. He graduated in 1953 from the medical school in Lodz, Poland, and continued postgraduate studies in surgery for 7 years at the Bytom campus of the Silesian University. He joined the faculty of this university in 1961, advanced to the rank of associate professor, and obtained the degree of Doctor of Science (ScD) in 1965.

In the same year, Kuzmak emigrated to the US, where he married his wife Roxana and their daughter Roxolana was born. From 1966 to 1971, he was resident and chief resident in general surgery at Saint Barnabas Medical Center in Livingston, New Jersey. He later developed a busy private practice in the same area, and opened the Surgical Center for Obesity at Irvington General Hospital in 1981.

== A pioneering career ==
In 1983, Kuzmak developed a Dacron-reinforced silicone band with a buckle, along with a banding instrument and a calibrating tube with electronic sensors to size the stoma. He positioned the band between the short gastric vessels (creating a pouch larger than is accepted nowadays), and also sutured the stomach over the band to prevent slippage.

In 1986, he published results in two journals. He also wrote a book chapter on the subject, presenting results on 212 patients with what he called non-inflatable silicone gastric banding. In 1991, he published 7-year results of his series. Kuzmak was an active member of the American Society for Bariatric Surgery since the meetings were held in the early 1980s in Iowa City, under the auspices of Edward Mason. He also contributed to the symposia organized by MAL Fobi in Los Angeles and Nicola Scopinaro in Genoa, as well as to many other American and international congresses.

In 1985, Kuzmak mobilized his inventive talent to design an adjustable band, adding an inflatable part connected to a tube and a reservoir (later redesigned with a stainless steel base), all made of radiopaque silicone. He obtained a US patent for the inflatable device on June 3, 1986, performing his first operation the same month. In his chapter, Kuzmak reports on 32 procedures, 21 primary and 11 revision. He published results of the stoma adjustable silicone gastric banding by laparotomy in 1991 and 1992, on 121 and 156 patients, respectively.

His invention was eventually improved and adapted to be placed laparoscopically (Lap-Band), by the then-named BioEnterics Company in Carpinteria, California. In the early 1990s, Kuzmak trained numerous bariatric surgeons at international workshops, initially from Italy, Belgium and Australia, on the use of his adjustable gastric band. An indefatigable ingenuity led him to obtain seven U.S. and another seven international patents for his various inventions.

Dr. Kuzmak's contributions and place in the history of bariatric surgery in the 20th century are undeniable. In addition to his pioneering work with the invention of his adjustable gastric band, he was a member and active participant at the meetings of several surgical societies and served on the Editorial Board of the Obesity Surgery journal. He was also a prominent member of the Ukrainian community in the U.S. and was recognized with Distinguished Honors for his humanitarian services by 'Americans for Human Rights in Ukraine'.

Doctor Lubomyr Kuzmak died of pneumonia on October 12, 2006. His obituary appeared in Surgery for Obesity and Related Diseases, the official journal of the American Society for Bariatric Surgery, January/February 2007.
