= Adjustable gastric band =

Inflatable silicone device

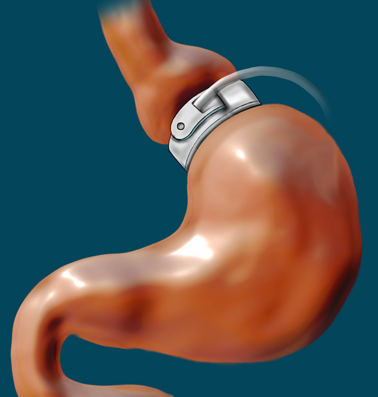
- Diagram of an adjustable gastric band
- Other names: Lap band
- ICD-9-CM: 44.95

A laparoscopic adjustable gastric band, commonly called a lap-band, A band, or LAGB, is an inflatable silicone device placed around the top portion of the stomach to treat obesity, intended to decrease food consumption.

Adjustable gastric band surgery is an example of bariatric surgery designed for obese patients with a body mass index (BMI) of 40 or greater—or between 35 and 40 in cases of patients with certain comorbidities that are known to improve with weight loss, such as sleep apnea, diabetes, osteoarthritis, GERD, hypertension (high blood pressure), or metabolic syndrome, among others.

In February 2011, the United States Food and Drug Administration (FDA) expanded approval of adjustable gastric bands to patients with a BMI between 30 and 40 and one weight-related medical condition, such as diabetes or high blood pressure. However, an adjustable gastric band may be used only after other methods such as diet and exercise have been tried.

== Working principle ==
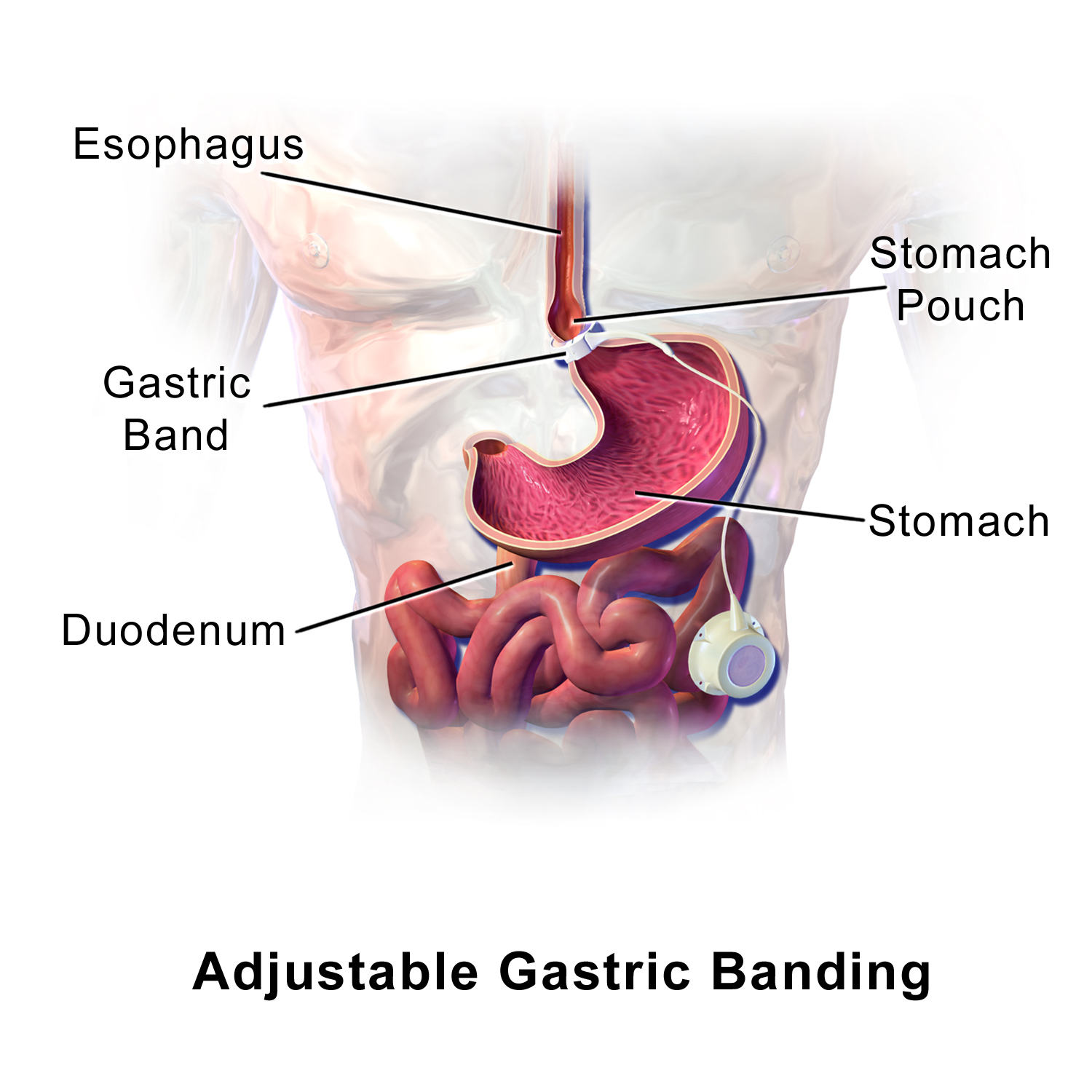
Illustration of adjustable gastric banding

The inflatable band is placed around the upper part of the stomach to create a smaller stomach pouch. This slows and limits the amount of food that can be consumed at one time, thus giving the opportunity for the sense of satiety to be met with the release of peptide YY (PYY). It does not decrease gastric emptying time. The individual achieves sustained weight loss by choosing healthy food options, limiting food intake and volume, reducing appetite, and progress of food from the top portion of the stomach to the lower portion digestion.

According to the American Society for Metabolic Bariatric Surgery, bariatric surgery is not an easy option for obesity sufferers. It is a drastic step, and carries the usual pain and risks of any major gastrointestinal surgical operation. However, gastric banding is the least invasive surgery of its kind and is completely reversible, with another "keyhole" operation. Gastric banding is performed using laparoscopic surgery and usually results in a shorter hospital stay, faster recovery, smaller scars, and less pain than open surgical procedures. Because no part of the stomach is stapled or removed, and the patient's intestines are not re-routed, they can continue to absorb nutrients from food normally. Gastric bands are made entirely of biocompatible materials, so they are able to stay in the patient's body without causing harm.

However, not all patients are suitable for laparoscopy. Patients who are extremely obese, who have had previous abdominal surgery, or have complicating medical problems may require the open approach.

=== Placement via laparoscopic surgery ===
The surgical insertion of an adjustable gastric band is often referred to as a lap band procedure or band placement. First, a small incision (typically less than 1.25 cm or 0.5 in.) is made near the belly button. Carbon dioxide (a gas that occurs naturally in the body) is introduced into the abdomen to create a work space for the surgeon. Then a small laparoscopic camera is placed through the incision into the abdomen. The camera sends a picture of the stomach and abdominal cavity to a video monitor. It gives the surgeon a good view of the key structures in the abdominal cavity. A few additional small incisions are made in the abdomen. The surgeon watches the video monitor and works through these small incisions using instruments with long handles to complete the procedure. The surgeon creates a small, circular tunnel behind the stomach, inserts the gastric band through the tunnel, and locks the band around the stomach.

Clinical studies of laparoscopic (minimally invasive) bariatric surgery patients found that they felt better, spent more time doing recreational and physical activities, benefited from enhanced productivity and economic opportunities, and had more self-confidence than they did prior to surgery.

=== Mechanics ===
The placement of the band creates a small pouch at the top of the stomach. This pouch holds approximately 1/2 cup (~120 mL) of food, whereas the typical stomach holds about 6 cups (~1,440 mL) of food. The pouch fills with food quickly, and the band slows the passage of food from the pouch to the lower part of the stomach. As the upper part of the stomach registers as full, the message to the brain is that the entire stomach is full, and this sensation helps the person to be hungry less often, feel full more quickly and for a longer period of time, eat smaller portions, and lose weight over time.

As patients lose weight, their bands will need adjustments, or "fills", to ensure comfort and effectiveness. The gastric band is adjusted by introducing a saline solution into a small access port placed just under the skin. A specialized non-coring needle is used to avoid damage to the port membrane and prevent leakage. There are many port designs (such as high profile and low profile), and they may be placed in varying positions based on the surgeon's preference, but are always attached (through sutures, staples, or another method) to the muscle wall in and around the diaphragm.

Adjustable gastric bands hold between 4 and 12 cc of saline solution, depending on their design. When the band is inflated with saline solution, it places pressure around the outside of the stomach. This decreases the size of the passage between the pouch created from the upper part of the stomach and the lower stomach and further restricts the movement of food. Over the course of several visits to the doctor, the band is filled until the optimal restriction has been achieved – neither so loose that hunger is not controlled, nor so tight that food cannot move through the digestive system. The number of adjustments required is an individual experience and cannot be accurately predicted.

=== Types of adjustable bands ===
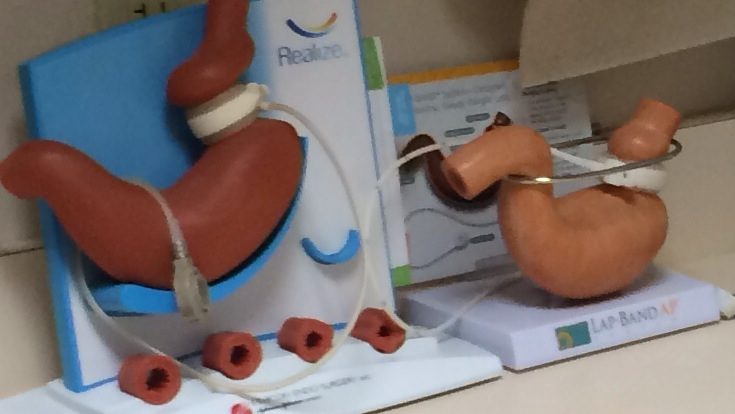
Realize and Lap-Band

In the U.S. market, one adjustable gastric band is currently approved by the FDA: Lap-Band. The Lap-Band System obtained FDA approval in 2001. The Realize Band lost FDA approval in 2016. The device comes in five different sizes and has undergone modification over the years. The latest models, the Lap-Band AP-L and Lap-Band AP-S, feature a standardized injection port sutured into the skin and fill volumes of 14 mL and 10 mL respectively.

Two other adjustable gastric bands are in use outside of the United States—Heliogast and Midband. Neither band has been approved by the FDA. The Midband was the first to market in 2000. In order to preserve the gastric wall in event of rubbing, the device contains no sharp edges or irregularities. It is also opaque to x-rays, making it easy to locate and adjust. The Heliogast band entered the market in 2003. The device features a streamlined band to ease insertion during the operation.

== Surgical indications ==
In general, gastric banding is indicated for people for whom all of the following apply:

- Body Mass Index above 40, or those who are 100 pounds (7 stone/45 kilograms) or more over their estimated ideal weight, according to the National Institutes of Health, or those with a BMI between 30 and 40 with co-morbidities that may improve with weight loss (type 2 diabetes, hypertension, high cholesterol, non-alcoholic fatty liver disease and obstructive sleep apnea.)
- Age between 18 and 55 years (although there are doctors who will work outside these ages, some as young as 12).
- Failure of medically supervised dietary therapy (for about 6 months).
- History of obesity (up to 5 years).
- Comprehension of the risks and benefits of the procedure and willingness to comply with the substantial lifelong dietary restrictions required for long-term success.

Gastric banding is usually not recommended for people with any of the following:

- If the surgery or treatment represents an unreasonable risk to the patient
- Untreated endocrine diseases such as hypothyroidism
- Inflammatory diseases of the gastrointestinal tract such as ulcers, esophagitis or Crohn's disease.
- Severe cardiopulmonary diseases or other conditions which may make them poor surgical candidates in general.
- An allergic reaction to materials contained in the band or who have exhibited a pain intolerance to implanted devices
- Dependency on alcohol or drugs
- People with severe learning or cognitive disabilities or emotionally unstable people.

=== Special considerations for pregnancy ===
If considering pregnancy, ideally the patient should be in optimum nutritional condition prior to, or immediately following, conception; deflation of the band may be required prior to a planned conception. Deflation should also be considered should the patient experience morning sickness. The band may remain deflated during pregnancy and once breast feeding is completed, or if bottle feeding, the band may be gradually re-inflated to aid postpartum weight loss as needed.

It is highly advised to take extra precautions during intercourse after surgery, as rapid weight loss increases fertility. Effective birth control methods must be used at all times to avoid unwanted pregnancies. Two factors have been pointed out by experts that may help explain this increase in fertility: reversal of polyendocrine metabolic ovarian syndrome (PMOS) and reduction in the excess of estrogen, which is produced by fat cells.

== Comparison with other bariatric surgeries ==
Unlike more open forms of weight loss surgery (e.g. Roux-en-Y gastric bypass surgery (RNY), Biliopancreatic diversion (BPD) and Duodenal Switch (DS)), gastric banding does not require cutting or removing any part of the digestive system. It is removable, requiring only a laparoscopic procedure to remove the band, after which the stomach usually returns to its normal pre-banded size so it is not unusual for a person to gain weight after having a band removed. However, it is not entirely reversible as adhesions and tissue scarring are inevitable. Unlike those who have procedures such as RNY, DS, or BPD, it is unusual for gastric band patients to experience any nutritional deficiencies or malabsorption of micro-nutrients. Calcium supplements and Vitamin B12 injections are not routinely required following gastric banding (as is often the case with RNY, for example). Gastric dumping syndrome issues also do not occur since intestines are not removed or re-routed.

Typically, patients who undergo adjustable gastric banding procedures lose less weight over the first 3.5 years than those who have RNY gastric bypass, BPD, or DS surgeries. Although other procedures appear to result in greater weight loss than adjustable gastric banding in the short term, results from the study by Maggard suggest that this difference decreases significantly over time. Gastric banding patients lose an average of 47.5% of their excess weight, according to a meta analysis by Buchwald.

To maintain weight reduction, patients must carefully follow post-operative guidelines relating to diet, exercise, and band maintenance. Weight regain is possible with any weight loss procedure, including the more radical procedures that initially result in rapid weight loss. The National Institutes of Health recommendation for weight loss is 1 to 2 pounds (½ to 1 kilogram) per week, and an average banded patient may lose this amount. This is variable based on the individual and their personal circumstances, motivation, and mobility.

=== Benefits of gastric banding when compared to other bariatric surgeries ===
- Lower mortality rate: only 1 in 1000 versus 1 in 250 for Roux-en-Y gastric bypass surgery
- No cutting or stapling of the stomach
- Short hospital stay
- Quick recovery
- Adjustable without additional surgery
- No malabsorption issues (because no intestines are bypassed)
- Fewer life-threatening complications (see complications table for details)

=== Potential complications ===
Some studies reveal there is a decrease in adjustable gastric banding surgeries due to the increased risk of reoperation, compared to Roux-en-Y gastric bypass (RYGB) or sleeve gastrectomy (SG) bariatric procedures.

One commonly reported occurrence for banded patients is regurgitation of non-acidic swallowed food from the upper pouch, commonly known as Productive Burping (PBing). Productive Burping is not to be considered normal. The patient should consider eating less, eating more slowly and chewing food more thoroughly. Occasionally, the narrow passage into the larger, lower part of the stomach might also become blocked by a large portion of unchewed or unsuitable food.

Other complications include:

- Ulceration
- Gastritis (irritated stomach tissue)
- Erosion – The band may slowly migrate through the stomach wall. This will result in the band moving from the outside of the stomach to the inside. This may occur silently but can cause severe problems. Urgent treatment may be required if there is any internal leak of gastric contents or bleeding.
- Slippage – An unusual occurrence in which the lower part of the stomach may prolapse through the band causing an enlarged upper pouch. In severe instances this can cause an obstruction and require an urgent operation to fix.
- Malposition of the band (rare with experienced practitioners):
  - If the band does not surround the vertical (esophagus-to-duodenum) axis of the stomach but instead surrounds only a non-vertical (horizontal or diagonal) axis of the stomach, as by encircling only a side or portion of a side of the stomach, then the restriction on food passage will be less, weight loss will be reduced, and a painful kink in the stomach may result.
  - In two reported cases, prompted by patients' reporting an absence of appetite suppression and of weight loss, investigation revealed that the band had not enclosed the stomach at all, instead enclosing only perigastric fat, with the effect that the passage of food was not restricted at all. In these cases, the patients experienced no additional adverse symptoms.
- Problems with the port and/or the tube connecting port and band – The port can "flip over" so that the membrane can no longer be accessed with a needle from the outside (this often goes hand in hand with a tube kink, and may require repositioning as a minor surgical procedure under local anaesthesia); the port may get disconnected from the tube or the tube may be perforated in the course of a port access attempt (both would result in loss of fill fluid and restriction, and likewise require a minor operation).
- Internal bleeding
- Infection

=== Documented adverse effects ===
The following are the adverse effects of gastric banding as documented by the FDA.

==== Band- and port-specific ====
- Band slippage/pouch dilation
- Esophageal dilatation/dysmotility
- Erosion of the band into the gastric lumen
- Mechanical malfunctions – port leakage, cracking of the kink-resistant tubing or disruption of the tubing connection from the port to the band
- Port site pain
- Port displacement
- Infection of the fluid within the band
- Bulging of the port through the skin

==== Digestive ====
- Nausea and/or vomiting
- Gastroesophageal reflux
- Stoma obstruction
- Dysphagia
- Diarrhea
- Abnormal stools
- Constipation
- Diverticulosis

==== Body as a whole ====
- Abdominal pain
- Asthenia
- Death
- Infection
- Fever
- Hernia
- Pain
- Chest pain
- Incisional infection
- Incision pain
- Blood clots
- Hair loss
- Gall stones
- Pancreatitis

==== Miscellaneous ====
- Abnormal healing
- Alopecia
- Band intolerance
- An inability to maintain proper restriction

== Losing weight after surgery ==
=== Effectiveness ===
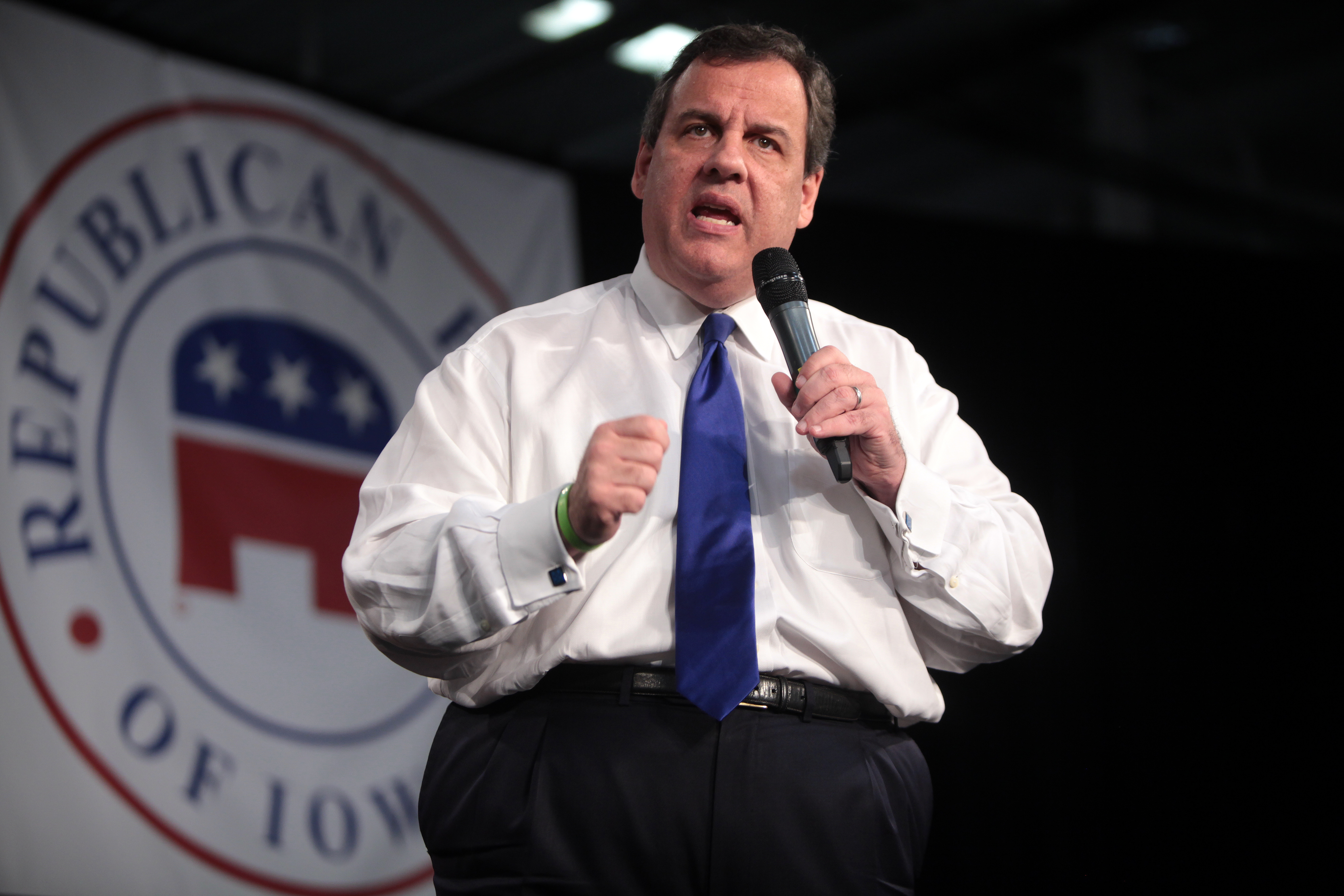
New Jersey Governor Chris Christie speaking at an event in October 2015, Christie underwent lap-band stomach surgery in February 2013.

The average gastric banding patient loses 500 grams to a kilogram (1–2 pounds) per week consistently, but heavier patients often lose faster in the beginning. This comes to roughly 22 to 45 kilograms (49 to 99 pounds) the first year for most band patients. It is important to keep in mind that while most of the RNY patients drop the weight faster in the beginning, some studies have found that LAGB patients will have the same percentage of excess weight loss and comparable ability to keep it off after only a couple of years. The procedure tends to encourage better eating habits which, in turn, helps in producing long term weight stability. However, with greater experience and longer patient follow up, several studies have found suboptimal weight loss and high complication rates for the gastric band.

A systematic review concluded "LAGB has been shown to produce a significant loss of excess weight while maintaining low rates of short-term complications and reducing obesity-related comorbidities. LAGB may not result in the most weight loss but it may be an option for bariatric patients who prefer or who are better suited to undergo less invasive and reversible surgery with lower perioperative complication rates. One caution with LAGB is the uncertainty about whether the low complication rate extends past three years, given a possibility of increased band-related complications (e.g., erosion, slippage) requiring re-operation".

Researcher Paul O’Brien, MD, of Melbourne, Australia's Monash University says the procedure offers an effective, reversible, long-term solution for weight loss as long as patients get good follow-up care and are willing to carefully control the way they eat. This study was supported by Allergan Inc., which markets a gastric band system.

A meta-analysis of 174,772 participants published in The Lancet in 2021 found that bariatric surgery was associated with 59% and 30% reduction in all-cause mortality among obese adults with or without type 2 diabetes respectively. This meta-analysis also found that median life-expectancy was 9.3 years longer for obese adults with diabetes who received bariatric surgery as compared to routine (non-surgical) care, whereas the life expectancy gain was 5.1 years longer for obese adults without diabetes.

=== Band adjustments and weight loss ===
Correct and sensitive adjustment of the band is imperative for weight loss and the long-term success of the procedure. Adjustments (also called "fills") may be performed using an X-ray fluoroscope so that the radiologist can assess the placement of the band, the port, and the tubing that runs between the port and the band. The patient is given a small cup of liquid containing a clear or white radio-opaque fluid similar to barium. When swallowed, the fluid is clearly shown on X–ray and is observed as it travels down the esophagus and through the restriction caused by the band. The radiologist is then able to see the level of restriction in the band and to assess if there are potential or developing issues of concern. These may include dilation of the esophagus, an enlarged pouch, prolapsed stomach (when part of the stomach moves into the band where it does not belong), erosion or migration. Reflux-type symptoms may indicate too great a restriction, and further assessment may be required.

Under some circumstances, fluid is removed from the band prior to further investigation and reevaluation. In other cases, further surgery may be required, such as removal of the band, should gastric erosion or a similar complication be detected. Some health practitioners adjust the band without the use of X-ray control (fluoroscopy). In these cases, the doctor assesses the patient's weight loss and potential reflex symptoms described by the patient, such as heartburn, regurgitation, or chest pain. From this information, the doctor decides whether a band adjustment is necessary. Adjustments are often indicated if a patient has regained weight, if weight loss has leveled off, or if the patient has a distinct feeling that food is difficult to move through the stomach.

Clinical visits for regular fill adjustments generally take only about one to two minutes. However, for some patients, this type of fill is not possible because of issues such as partial rotation of the port or excess tissue above the port presenting difficulty in determining its precise location. In these cases, a fluoroscope will generally be used. It is more common practice for the band not to be filled at surgery, although some surgeons choose to place a small amount in the band at the time of surgery. The stomach tends to swell following surgery and it is possible that too great a restriction would be achieved if filled at that time.

Many health practitioners make the first adjustment between four and six weeks post-operatively to allow the stomach time to heal. After that, fills are performed as needed.

No accurate number of adjustments required can be given. The amount of saline/isotonic solution needed in the band varies from patient to patient. There are a small number of people who find that they do not need a fill at all and have sufficient restriction immediately following surgery. Others may need significant adjustments to the maximum that the band is able to hold.

=== Post-surgical diet and care ===
The patient may be prescribed a liquid-only diet, followed by mushy foods and then solids. This is prescribed for a varied length of time and each surgeon and manufacturer varies. Some may find that before their first fill, they are still able to eat fairly large portions, because before the fill, there is little or no restriction in the band. Thus a proper post-op diet and a good after-care plan are essential to success. A recent study found that patients who did not change their eating habits were 2.2 times more likely to be unsuccessful than those who did, and that patients who had not increased their physical activity were 2.3 times more likely to be unsuccessful than those who did.

A long-term, post-gastric-band surgery diet should consist of normal healthy food that is solid in nature and requires ample chewing to achieve a paste consistency prior to swallowing. This texture will maximise the effect of the band, in contrast to easier wet foods, such as soups, casseroles and smoothies, which pass through the band quickly and easily resulting in greater caloric intake.

Support groups exist for gastric-banding patients. Some mix RNY and gastric-bypass patients with gastric-banding patients. Some gastric-band patients have criticized this approach because, while many of the underlying issues related to obesity are the same, the needs and challenges of the two groups are very different, as are their early rates of weight loss. Some gastric-band recipients feel that the procedure is a failure when they see that RNY patients generally lose weight faster.

== Cost of gastric banding ==
Adjustable gastric-band surgery costs about $15,000 in the United States, although state-specific averages range from about $10,500 (Colorado and Texas) to over $33,000 (Alaska). Services included in these costs vary by surgical clinic and hospital, but most practices include all services necessary to perform the procedure (surgeon's fee, surgical assistant fee, hospital/operating room fee, anesthesiologist fee and the device fee for the gastric band itself). Some practices also bundle a set duration of post-operative follow-up visits for filling and unfilling the gastric band as necessary (e.g., as many fills/unfills as necessary for anywhere from three to 13 months following surgery, depending on the practice), which as a standalone service costs between $15 and $300 per office visit. Most practices do not include within their quoted fees the cost of preoperative care and testing or any potential complications that may arise.

== History and development of gastric banding ==
=== Non-adjustable bands ===
At the end of the 1970s, Wilkinson developed several surgical approaches with a common aim to limit food intake without disrupting the continuity of the gastrointestinal tract.

In 1978 Wilkinson and Peloso were the first to place, by open procedure, a non-adjustable band (2 cm Marlex mesh) around the upper part of the stomach.

The early 1980s saw further developments, with Kolle (Norway), Molina & Oria (U.S.), Naslund (Sweden), Frydenberg (Australia) and Kuzmack (U.S.) implanting non-adjustable gastric bands made from a variety of materials, including marlex mesh, dacron vascular prosthesis, silicone covered mesh and Gore-Tex, among others. In addition, Bashour developed the "gastro-clip", a 10.5 cm polypropylene clip with a 50cc pouch and a fixed 1.25 cm stoma, which was later abandoned because of its high rates of gastric erosion.

All of these early attempts at restriction using meshes, bands and clips showed a high failure rate because of difficulty achieving correct stomal diameter, stomach slippage, erosion, food intolerance, intractable vomiting and pouch dilatation. Despite these difficulties, silicone was identified as the best-tolerated material, with far fewer adhesions and tissue reactions occurring than with other materials. Nevertheless, adjustability became a primary goal of these early pioneers.

=== Adjustable bands ===
The development of the modern adjustable gastric band is a tribute both to the vision and persistence of the early pioneers, particularly Lubomyr Kuzmak and a sustained collaborative effort on the part of bio-engineers, surgeons and scientists.

Early research on the concept of band “adjustability” can be traced back to the early work of G. Szinicz (Austria) who experimented with an adjustable band, connected to a subcutaneous port, in animals.

In 1986, Lubomyr Kuzmak, a Ukrainian surgeon who had emigrated to the United States in 1965, reported on the clinical use of the "adjustable silicone gastric band" (ASGB) via open surgery. Kuzmak, who from the early 1980s had been searching for a simple and safe restrictive procedure for severe obesity, modified his original silicone non-adjustable band, which he had been using since 1983, by adding an adjustable portion. His clinical results showed improved weight loss and reduced complication rates compared with his original non-adjustable band. Kuzmak's major contributions were the application of Mason's teachings about VBG to the development of the gastric band, the volume of the pouch, the need to overcome staple line disruption, the ratification of the use of silicone and the essential element of adjustability.

Separately, but in parallel with Kuzmak, Hallberg and Forsell in Stockholm, Sweden also developed an adjustable gastric band. After further work and modifications this eventually became known as the Swedish Adjustable Gastric Band (SAGB).

In early 1985, Dr. Dag Hallberg applied for a patent for the SAGB within Scandinavian countries. In late March, Dr. Hallberg presented his idea of the "balloon band" at the Swedish Surgical Society and started to use the SAGB in a controlled series of 50 procedures. At the time, laparoscopic surgery was uncommon and Dr. Hallberg and his assistant, Dr. Peter Forsell, started performing the open technique to implant the SAGB.

In 1992, Forsell, who fully owned the patent, was in contact with surgeons in Switzerland, Italy and Germany who began to implant the SAGB with the laparoscopic technique. In 1994, Dr. Forsell presented the SAGB at an international workshop for bariatric surgery in Sweden, and from then on, the SAGB would be implanted laparoscopically. During this time, the SAGB was manufactured by Swedish company ATOS Medical.

=== The laparoscopic era ===
The advent of surgical laparoscopy has transformed the field of bariatric surgery and made the gastric band a more appealing option for the surgical management of obesity. In 1992, Prof. Guy-Bernard Cadière was the first to apply an adjustable band (the Kuzmak ASGB device) by the laparoscopic approach. Over the next few years, the Kuzmak ASGB was modified to make it suitable for laparoscopic implantation, eventually emerging as the modern lap band. This landmark innovation was driven by Belachew, Cadière, Favretti and O’Brien, and the Inamed Development Company engineered the device. The first human laparoscopic implantation of the newly developed lap band was performed by Belachew and le Grand on 1 September 1993 in Huy, Belgium, followed on 8 September by Cadière and Favretti in Padua, Italy. In 1993, Broadbent in Australia and Catona in Italy implanted non-adjustable (Molina-type) gastric bands by laparoscopy. In 1994, the first international laparoscopic-band workshop was held in Belgium and the first involving the SAGB was held in Sweden.

Single-port laparoscopy (SPL) is an advanced, minimally invasive procedure in which the surgeon operates almost exclusively through a single entry point, typically the navel. Special articulating instruments and access ports make it unnecessary to place trocars externally for triangulation, thus allowing the creation of a small, solitary portal of entry into the abdomen. The SPL technique has been used to perform many types of surgery, including adjustable gastric banding and sleeve gastrectomy.

In 2003, the American Institute of Gastric Banding (AIGB) True Results opened the first outpatient surgery center using advanced laparoscopic technology to be recognized by the American College of Surgeons as an accredited outpatient bariatric center in the U.S. The first outpatient lap-band procedure in the U.S. was performed at the AIGB True Results Surgery Center of Richardson, Texas in 2003, and since that time, AIGB True Results has performed more than 30,000 outpatient lap-band procedures.

== Safety ==
In 2012 there was a request for a congressional investigation by members of the U.S. Congress into lapband safety, prompted by recent patient deaths after lapband surgeries at clinics affiliated with the 1-800-GET-THIN advertising campaign in Southern California.

== Awareness ==
As with many developments in approaches to weight loss, some public figures have affected public opinion and increased awareness of gastric banding:

- Khaliah Ali (daughter of Muhammad Ali)
- Fern Britton
- Professor Chris Oliver – Surgeon, Professor Physical Activity. LapBand failed and subsequently in 2020 had gastric bypass surgery.
- Sharon Osbourne
