= Gastric bypass surgery =

Type of bariatric surgery

- A diagram of a gastric bypass (Roux-en-Y)
- ICD-9-CM: 44.31-44.39
- MeSH: D015390
- MedlinePlus: 007199

Gastric bypass surgery refers to a technique in which the stomach is divided into a small upper pouch and a much larger lower "remnant" pouch, where the small intestine is rearranged to connect to both. Surgeons have developed several different ways to reconnect the intestine, thus leading to several different gastric bypass procedures (GBP). Any GBP leads to a marked reduction in the functional volume of the stomach, accompanied by an altered physiological and physical response to food.

The operation is prescribed to treat severe obesity (defined as a body mass index greater than 40), type 2 diabetes, hypertension, obstructive sleep apnea and other comorbid conditions. Bariatric surgery is the term encompassing all of the surgical treatments for severe obesity, not just gastric bypasses, which make up only one class of such operations. The resulting weight loss, typically dramatic, markedly reduces comorbidities. The long-term mortality rate of gastric bypass patients has been shown to be reduced by up to 40%. (Note: Adams TD, Gress RE, Smith SC, Halverson RC, Simper SC, Rosamond WD, et al. (August 2007). "Long-term mortality after gastric bypass surgery". The New England Journal of Medicine (Journal Article). 357 (8). Massachusetts Medical Society: 753–61. doi:10.1056/NEJMoa066603. eISSN 1533-4406. LCCN 20020456. OCLC 231027780. PMID 17715409. S2CID 8710295. "During a mean follow-up of 7.1 years, adjusted long-term mortality from any cause in the surgery group decreased by 40%, as compared with that in the control group (37.6 vs. 57.1 deaths per 10,000 person-years, P<0.001); cause-specific mortality in the surgery group decreased by 56% for coronary artery disease (2.6 vs. 5.9 per 10,000 person-years, P=0.006), by 92% for diabetes (0.4 vs. 3.4 per 10,000 person-years, P=0.005), and by 60% for cancer (5.5 vs. 13.3 per 10,000 person-years, P<0.001).") (Note: Sjöström L, Narbro K, Sjöström CD, Karason K, Larsson B, Wedel H, et al. (August 2007). "Effects of bariatric surgery on mortality in Swedish obese subjects". The New England Journal of Medicine (Journal Article). 357 (8). Massachusetts Medical Society: 741–52. doi:10.1056/NEJMoa066254. eISSN 1533-4406. LCCN 20020456. OCLC 231027780. PMID 17715408. S2CID 20533869. "Bariatric surgery for severe obesity is associated with long-term weight loss and decreased overall mortality.") As with all surgery, complications may occur. A study from 2005 to 2006 revealed that 15% of patients experienced complications as a result of gastric bypass, and 0.5% of patients died within six months of surgery due to complications. A meta-analysis of 174,772 participants published in The Lancet in 2021 found that bariatric surgery was associated with 59% and 30% reduction in all-cause mortality among obese adults with or without type 2 diabetes, respectively. This meta-analysis also found that median life-expectancy was 9.3 years longer for obese adults with diabetes who received bariatric surgery as compared to routine (non-surgical) care, whereas the life expectancy gain was 5.1 years longer for obese adults without diabetes.

== Uses ==
Gastric bypass is indicated for the surgical treatment of severe obesity, a diagnosis which is made when the patient is seriously obese, has been unable to achieve satisfactory and sustained weight loss by dietary efforts and has comorbid conditions that are either life-threatening or serious impairment to the quality of life.

Before 1991, clinicians interpreted serious obesity as weighing at least 100 pounds (45 kg) more than the "ideal body weight", an actuarially determined body weight at which one was estimated to be likely to live the longest, as determined by the life-insurance industry. This criterion failed for persons of short stature.

In 1991, the National Institutes of Health (NIH) sponsored a consensus panel whose recommendations have set the current standard for consideration of surgical treatment, the body mass index (BMI). The BMI is defined as the body weight (in kilograms), divided by the square of the height (in meters). The result is expressed as a number in kilograms per square meter. In healthy adults, BMI ranges from 18.5 to 24.9, with a BMI above 30 considered obese, and a BMI less than 18.5 considered underweight.

The Consensus Panel of the National Institutes of Health (NIH) recommended the following criteria for consideration of bariatric surgery, including gastric bypass procedures:

- people who have a BMI of 40 or higher
- people with a BMI of 35 or higher with one or more related comorbid conditions

The Consensus Panel also emphasized the necessity of multidisciplinary care of the bariatric surgical patient by a team of physicians and therapists to manage associated comorbidities and nutrition, physical activity, behavior and psychological needs. The surgical procedure is best regarded as a tool that enables the patient to alter lifestyle and eating habits, and to achieve effective and permanent management of obesity and eating behavior.

Since 1991, major developments in the field of bariatric surgery, particularly laparoscopy, have outdated some of the conclusions of the NIH panel. In 2004 the American Society for Bariatric Surgery (ASBS) sponsored a consensus conference which updated the evidence and the conclusions of the NIH panel. This conference, composed of physicians and scientists of both surgical and non-surgical disciplines, reached several conclusions, including:

- bariatric surgery is the most effective treatment for severe obesity
- gastric bypass is one of four types of operations for severe obesity
- laparoscopic surgery is equally effective and as safe as open surgery
- patients should undergo comprehensive preoperative evaluation and have multi-disciplinary support for optimum outcome

In recent comparisons with sleeve gastrectomy, gastric bypass has shown slightly better outcomes in diabetes remission and weight maintenance. According to a 2021 evidence update, Roux-en-Y gastric bypass (RYGB) patients were more likely to maintain weight loss over five years, with a reduced relapse rate in Type 2 diabetes. However, RYGB was associated with a higher frequency of follow-up surgeries and hospitalizations due to complications.

== Surgical techniques ==
The gastric bypass, in its various forms, accounts for a large majority of the bariatric surgical procedures performed. It is estimated that 200,000 such operations were performed in the United States in 2008.

Laparoscopic surgery is performed using several small incisions, or ports: one to insert a surgical telescope connected to a video camera, and others to permit access to specialized operating instruments. The surgeon views the operation on a video screen. Laparoscopy is also called limited access surgery, reflecting the limitation on handling and feeling tissues and also the limited resolution and two-dimensionality of the video image. With experience, a skilled laparoscopic surgeon can perform most procedures as expeditiously as with an open incision—with the option of using an incision should the need arise. (Note: Wittgrove AC, Clark GW (June 2000). "Laparoscopic gastric bypass, Roux-en-Y- 500 patients: technique and results, with 3-60 month follow-up". Obesity Surgery (Journal Article). 10 (3). Springer-Verlag: 233–9. doi:10.1381/096089200321643511. eISSN 1708-0428. LCCN 2001301458. OCLC 23835796. PMID 10929154. S2CID 33015279. "We began to explore techniques for laparoscopic performance of the gastric bypass in 1993, adhering to the fundamental principle that essential features of the open operation must not be modified or compromised, to achieve the limited access technique. After laboratory verification of the instrument techniques, we performed our first procedure in late 1993.")

The Roux-en-Y laparoscopic gastric bypass, first performed and reported on in case studies between 1993 and 1994, is regarded as one of the most difficult procedures to perform by limited access techniques. The use of this method has greatly popularized the operation due to associated benefits such as a shortened hospital stay, reduced discomfort, shorter recovery time, less scarring, and minimal risk of incisional hernia.

=== Essential features ===
The gastric bypass procedure consists of:

- Creation of a small, 15–30 mL (1–2 tbsp) pouch from the upper stomach, accompanied by bypass of the remaining stomach (about 400 mL and variable). This restricts the volume of food that can be eaten. The stomach may simply be partitioned (like a wall between two rooms in a house or two office cubicles next to each other with a partition wall in between them—and typically by the use of surgical staples), or it may be divided into two separate/separated parts (also with staples). Total division (separate/separated parts) is usually advocated to reduce the possibility that the two parts of the stomach will heal back together ("fistulize") and negate the operation.
- Re-construction of the GI tract to enable drainage of both segments of the stomach. The particular technique used for this reconstruction produces several variants of the operation, differing in the lengths of the small intestine used, the degree to which food absorption is affected, and the likelihood of adverse nutritional effects. Usually, a segment of the small bowel (called the alimentary limb) is brought up to the proximal remains of the stomach.

=== Variations ===
==== Gastric bypass, Roux-en-Y (RYGB, proximal) ====
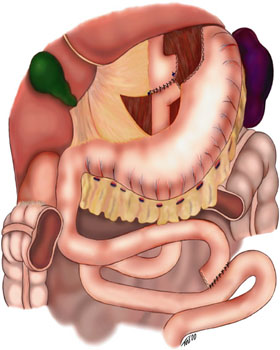
Graphic of a gastric bypass using a Roux-en-Y anastomosis. The transverse colon is not shown so that the Roux-en-Y can be seen. The variant seen in this image is retro colic, retro gastric because the distal small bowel that joins the proximal segment of the stomach is behind the transverse colon and stomach.

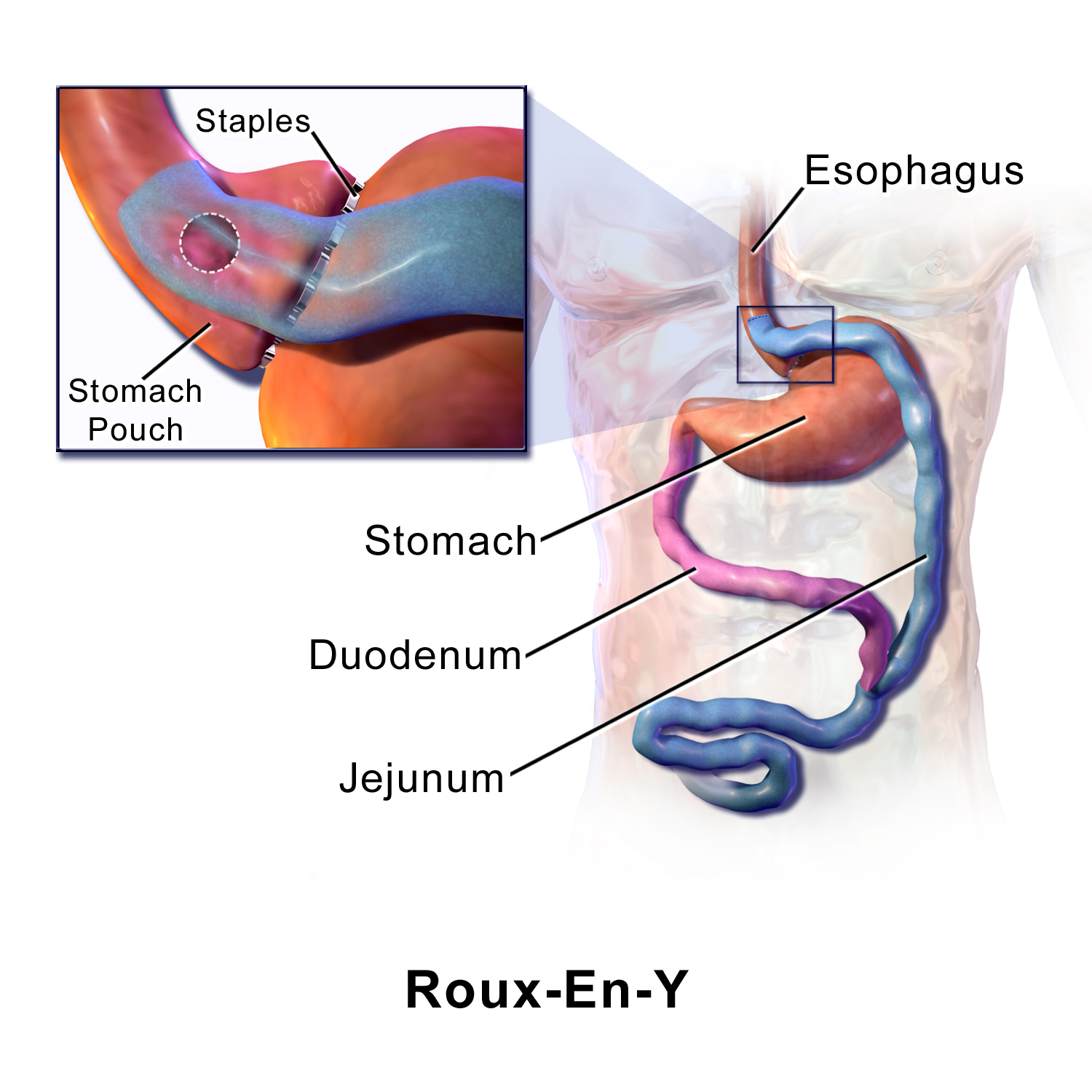
Illustration of Roux-en-Y gastric bypass surgery

This variant is the most commonly employed gastric bypass technique and is by far the most commonly performed bariatric procedure in the United States. The small intestine is divided approximately 45 cm (18 in) below the lower stomach outlet and is re-arranged into a Y-configuration, enabling outflow of food from the small upper stomach pouch via a "Roux limb". In the proximal version, the Y-intersection is formed near the upper (proximal) end of the small intestine. The Roux limb is constructed using 80–150 cm (31–59 in) of the small intestine, preserving the rest (and the majority) of it from absorbing nutrients. The patient will experience a very rapid onset of the stomach feeling full, followed by a growing satiety (or "indifference" to food) shortly after the start of a meal.

==== Gastric bypass, Roux-en-Y (RYGB, distal) ====
The small intestine is normally 20–22 ft (6.1–6.7 m) in length. As the Y-connection is moved further down the gastrointestinal tract, the amount available to fully absorb nutrients is progressively reduced, traded for greater effectiveness of the operation. The Y-connection is formed much closer to the lower (distal) end of the small intestine, usually 100–150 cm (39–59 in) from the lower end, causing reduced absorption (malabsorption) of food: primarily of fats and starches, but also of various minerals and the fat-soluble vitamins. The unabsorbed fats and starches pass into the large intestine, where bacterial actions may act on them to produce irritants and malodorous gases. These larger effects on nutrition are traded for a relatively modest increase in total weight loss.

==== Mini-gastric bypass (MGB) ====
The mini-gastric bypass procedure was first developed by Robert Rutledge from the US in 1997, as a modification of the standard Billroth II procedure. A mini gastric bypass creates a long narrow tube of the stomach along its right border (the lesser curvature). A loop of the small gut is brought up and hooked to this tube at about 180 cm from the start of the intestine.

Numerous studies show that the loop reconstruction (Billroth II gastrojejunostomy) works more safely when placed low on the stomach, but can be a disaster when placed adjacent to the esophagus. Today thousands of "loops" are used for surgical procedures to treat gastric problems such as ulcers, stomach cancer, and injury to the stomach. The mini-gastric bypass uses the low set loop reconstruction and thus has rare chances of bile reflux.

The MGB has been suggested as an alternative to the Roux-en-Y procedure due to the simplicity of its construction and is becoming more and more popular because of low risk of complications and good sustained weight loss. It has been estimated that 15.4% of weight loss surgery in Asia is now performed via the MGB technique. (Note: Lomanto D, Lee WJ, Goel R, Lee JJ, Shabbir A, So JB, et al. (March 2012). "Bariatric surgery in Asia in the last 5 years (2005-2009)". Obesity Surgery (Journal Article). 22 (3). Springer-Verlag: 502–6. doi:10.1007/s11695-011-0547-2. eISSN 1708-0428. LCCN 2001301458. OCLC 23835796. PMID 22033767. S2CID 207304196. "For combined years 2005-2009, the four most commonly performed procedures were laparoscopic adjustable gastric banding (LAGB, 35.9%), laparoscopic standard Roux-en-Y gastric bypass (LRYGB, 24.3%), laparoscopic sleeve gastrectomy (LSG, 19.5%), and laparoscopic mini gastric bypass (15.4%).")

==== Endoscopic duodenal-jejunal bypass ====
This technique has been clinically researched since the mid-2000s. It involves the implantation of a duodenal-jejunal bypass liner between the beginning of the duodenum (first portion of the small intestine from the stomach) and the mid-jejunum (the secondary stage of the small intestine). This prevents the partially digested food from entering the first and initial part of the secondary stage of the small intestine, mimicking the effects of the biliopancreatic portion of Roux-en-Y gastric bypass (RYGB) surgery. Despite a handful of serious adverse events such as gastrointestinal bleeding, abdominal pain, and device migration—all resolved with device removal—initial clinical trials have produced promising results in the treatment's ability to improve weight loss and glucose homeostasis outcomes. (Note: Shelby S (2015). "Endoscopic Treatment of Obesity". In Jonnalagadda SS (ed.). Gastrointestinal Endoscopy: New Technologies and Changing Paradigms (2015 ed.). Springer Publishing. pp. 61–82. doi:10.1007/978-1-4939-20317 (inactive 12 July 2025). ISBN 978-1-4939-2031-0. OCLC 945669699.) (Note: Muñoz R, Escalona A (15 September 2015). "Chapter 51: Endoscopic Duodenal-Jejunal Bypass Sleeve Treatment for Obesity". In Agrawal S (ed.). Obesity, Bariatric and Metabolic Surgery: A Practical Guide (2015 ed.). Springer Publishing. pp. 493–498. doi:10.1007/978-3-319-04343-2. ISBN 978-3-319-04342-5. OCLC 930041021. S2CID 78095942.)

== Physiology ==
The gastric bypass reduces the size of the stomach by well over 90%. A normal stomach can stretch, sometimes to over 1000 mL, while the pouch of the gastric bypass may be 15 mL in size. The gastric bypass pouch is usually formed from the part of the stomach that is least susceptible to stretching. That, and its small original size, prevents any significant long-term change in pouch volume. What does change, over time, is the size of the connection between the stomach and intestine and the ability of the small intestine to hold a greater volume of food. Over time, the functional capacity of the pouch increases; by that time, weight loss has occurred, and the increased capacity should serve to allow maintenance of a lower body weight.

When the patient ingests just a small amount of food, the first response is a stretching of the wall of the stomach pouch, stimulating nerves that tell the brain that the stomach is full. The patient feels a sensation of fullness as if they had just eaten a large meal—but with just a thimbleful of food. Most people do not stop eating simply in response to a feeling of fullness, but the patient rapidly learns that subsequent bites must be eaten very slowly and carefully, to avoid increasing discomfort or vomiting.

Food is first churned in the stomach before passing into the small intestine. When the lumen of the small intestine comes into contact with nutrients, several hormones are released, including cholecystokinin from the duodenum and PYY and GLP-1 from the ileum. These hormones inhibit further food intake and have thus been dubbed "satiety factors". Ghrelin is a hormone that is released in the stomach that stimulates hunger and food intake. Changes in circulating hormone levels after gastric bypass have been hypothesized to produce reductions in food intake and body weight in obese patients. However, these findings remain controversial, and the exact mechanisms by which gastric bypass surgery reduces food intake and body weight have yet to be elucidated.

For example, it is still widely perceived that gastric bypass works by mechanical means, i.e. food restriction and/or malabsorption. Recent clinical and animal studies, however, have indicated that these long-held inferences about the mechanisms of Roux-en-Y gastric bypass (RYGB) may not be correct. A growing body of evidence suggests that profound changes in body weight and metabolism resulting from RYGB cannot be explained by simple mechanical restriction or malabsorption. One study in rats found that RYGB induced a 19% increase in total and a 31% increase in resting energy expenditure, an effect not exhibited in vertical sleeve gastrectomy rats. In addition, pair-fed rats lost only 47% as much weight as their RYGB counterparts. Changes in food intake after RYGB only partially account for RYGB-induced weight loss, and there is no evidence of clinically significant malabsorption of calories contributing to weight loss. Thus, it appears RYGB affects weight loss by altering the physiology of weight regulation and eating behavior rather than by simple mechanical restriction or malabsorption. (Note: Stylopoulos N, Hoppin AG, Kaplan LM (October 2009). "Roux-en-Y gastric bypass enhances energy expenditure and extends lifespan in diet-induced obese rats". Obesity (Journal Article). 17 (10). The Obesity Society: 1839–47. doi:10.1038/oby.2009.207. eISSN 1930-739X. PMC 4157127. PMID 19556976. "Despite its widespread clinical use, the mechanisms by which RYGB induces its profound weight loss remain largely unknown. This procedure affects weight loss by altering the physiology of weight regulation and eating behavior rather than by simple mechanical restriction and/or malabsorption as previously thought.") This hypothesis suggesting altered physiology is highly debated, and has no primary evidence supporting it. Anecdotal evidence is clear in that following gastric bypass surgery, eating after stomach distension causes nausea, discomfort, and vomiting, so patients very quickly learn to avoid overeating, which is agreed to be the main cause of weight loss following the surgery.

To gain the maximum benefit from this physiology, it is important that the patient eat only at mealtimes, 5 to 6 small meals daily, and not graze between meals. Concentration on obtaining 80–100 g of daily protein is necessary. Meals after surgery are 1/4 cup (~60 mL) to 1/2 cup (~120 mL), slowly getting to 1 cup (~240 mL) by one year. This requires a change in eating behavior and an alteration of long-acquired habits for finding food. In almost every case where weight gain occurs late after surgery, the capacity for a meal has not greatly increased. Some assume the cause of regaining weight must be the patient's fault, e.g. eating between meals with high-caloric snack foods, though this has been debated. Others believe it is an unpredictable failure or limitation of the surgery for certain patients (e.g. reactive hypoglycemia).

== Complications ==
Any major surgery involves the potential for complications—adverse events that increase risk, hospital stay, and mortality. Some complications are common to all abdominal operations, while some are specific to bariatric surgery.

=== Mortality and complication rates ===
The overall rate of complications during the 30 days following surgery ranges from 7% for laparoscopic procedures to 14.5% for operations through open incisions. One study on mortality revealed a 0% mortality rate out of 401 laparoscopic cases, and 0.6% out of 955 open procedures. Similar mortality rates—30-day mortality of 0.11%, and 90-day mortality of 0.3%—have been recorded in the U.S. Centers of Excellence program, the results being from 33,117 operations at 106 centers.

Mortality and complications are affected by pre-existing risk factors such as degree of obesity, heart disease, obstructive sleep apnea, diabetes mellitus, and history of prior pulmonary embolism. It is also affected by the experience of the operating surgeon: the learning curve for laparoscopic bariatric surgery is estimated to be about 100 cases. Supervision and experience are important when selecting a surgeon, as the way a surgeon becomes experienced in dealing with problems is by encountering and solving them.

=== Complications of abdominal surgery ===
==== Infection ====
Infection of the incisions or the inside of the abdomen (peritonitis, abscess) may occur due to the release of bacteria from the bowel during the operation. Nosocomial infections, such as pneumonia, bladder or kidney infections, and sepsis (blood-borne infection) are also possible. Effective short-term use of antibiotics, diligent respiratory therapy, and encouragement of activity within a few hours after surgery can reduce the risks of infections.

==== Venous thromboembolism ====
Any injury, such as a surgical operation, causes the body to increase the coagulation of the blood. Simultaneously, activity may be reduced. Gastric Bypass Surgery is done with minimally invasive techniques (laparoscopy). Due to insufflation of the abdominal cavity with CO_{2} for the surgery, the venous return is diminished and this will lead to deep vein thrombosis of the lower extremities. There is an increased probability of the formation of clots in the veins of the legs, or sometimes the pelvis, particularly in severely obese patients. A clot that breaks free and floats to the lungs is called a pulmonary embolus, a very dangerous occurrence. Blood thinners are commonly administered before surgery to reduce the probability of this type of complication.

==== Hemorrhage ====
Many blood vessels must be cut to divide the stomach and to move the bowel. Any of these may later begin bleeding, either into the abdomen (intra-abdominal hemorrhage) or into the bowel itself (gastrointestinal hemorrhage). Transfusions may be needed, and re-operation is sometimes necessary. The use of blood thinners to prevent venous thromboembolic disease may increase the risk of hemorrhage slightly.

==== Hernia ====
A hernia is an abnormal opening, either within the abdomen or through the abdominal wall muscles. An internal hernia may result from surgery and re-arrangement of the bowel and is a cause of bowel obstruction. Antecolic antegastric Roux-en-Y gastric bypass surgery has been estimated to result in internal hernia in 0.2% of cases, mainly through Petersen's defect. (Note: Cho M, Pinto D, Carrodeguas L, Lascano C, Soto F, Whipple O, et al. (13 April 2005). "Frequency and management of internal hernias after laparoscopic antecolic antegastric Roux-en-Y gastric bypass without division of the small bowel mesentery or closure of mesenteric defects: review of 1400 consecutive cases". Surgery for Obesity and Related Diseases (Journal Article). 2 (2). Elsevier: 87–91. doi:10.1016/j.soard.2005.11.004. eISSN 1878-7533. OCLC 723554412. PMID 16925328. "Three patients (0.2%) developed a symptomatic internal hernia. Two of these patients had a 200—cm—long Roux limb, and the other had a 100—cm—long Roux limb. All three patients exhibited mild symptoms of partial small bowel obstruction. In all three cases, the internal hernia was clinically manifested more than 10 months after the original AA—LRYGBP.") An incisional hernia occurs when a surgical incision does not heal well; the muscles of the abdomen separate and allow protrusion of a sac-like membrane, which may contain bowel or other abdominal contents, and which can be painful and unsightly. The risk of abdominal-wall hernia is markedly decreased in laparoscopic surgery.

==== Bowel obstruction ====
Abdominal surgery always results in some scarring of the bowel, called adhesions. A hernia, either internal or through the abdominal wall, may also result. When the bowel becomes trapped by adhesions or a hernia, it may become kinked and obstructed, sometimes many years after the original procedure. An operation is usually necessary to correct this problem.

=== Complications of gastric bypass ===
==== Anastomotic leakage ====
An anastomosis is a surgical connection between the stomach and bowel, or between two parts of the bowel. The surgeon attempts to create a water-tight connection by connecting the two organs with either staples or sutures, either of which makes a hole in the bowel wall. The surgeon will rely on the body's natural healing abilities and its ability to create a seal, like a self-sealing tire, to succeed with the surgery. If that seal fails to form for any reason, fluid from within the gastrointestinal tract can leak into the sterile abdominal cavity and give rise to infection and abscess formation. Leakage of an anastomosis can occur in about 2% of Roux-en-Y gastric bypass and less than 1% in mini gastric bypass. Leaks usually occur at the gastrojejunostomy area.

==== Anastomotic stricture ====
As the anastomosis heals, it forms scar tissue, which naturally tends to shrink ("contract") over time, making the opening smaller. This is called a "stricture". Usually, the passage of food through an anastomosis will keep it stretched open, but if the inflammation and healing process outpaces the stretching process, scarring may make the opening so small that even liquids can no longer pass through it. The solution is a procedure called gastro endoscopy, and stretching of the connection by inflating a balloon inside it. Sometimes this manipulation may have to be performed more than once to achieve lasting correction.

==== Anastomotic ulcer ====
Ulceration of the anastomosis occurs in 1–16% of patients. Possible causes of such ulcers are:

- Restricted blood supply to the anastomosis (compared to the blood supply available to the original stomach)
- Anastomosis tension
- Gastric acid
- The bacteria Helicobacter pylori
- Smoking
- Use of non-steroidal anti-inflammatory drugs

This condition can be treated with:

- Proton pump inhibitors, e.g. esomeprazole
- A cytoprotectant and acid buffering agent, e.g. sucralfate
- Temporary restriction of the consumption of solid foods

==== Dumping syndrome ====
Normally, the pyloric valve at the lower end of the stomach regulates the release of food into the bowel. When the gastric bypass patient eats a sugary food, the sugar passes rapidly into the intestine, where it gives rise to a physiological reaction called dumping syndrome. The body will flood the intestines with gastric content in an attempt to dilute the sugars. An affected person may feel their heart beating rapidly and forcefully, break into a cold sweat, get a feeling of butterflies in the stomach, and may have an anxiety attack. The person usually has to lie down and could be very uncomfortable for 30–45 minutes. Diarrhea may then follow.

=== Nutritional deficiencies ===
Nutritional deficiencies are common after gastric bypass surgery and are often not recognized. They include: (Note: John S, Hoegerl C (November 2009). "Nutritional deficiencies after gastric bypass surgery". The Journal of the American Osteopathic Association (Journal Article). 109 (11). American Osteopathic Association: 601–4. doi:10.7556/jaoa.2009.109.11.601 (inactive 12 July 2025). eISSN 1945-1997. LCCN 90641783. OCLC 1081714. PMID 19948694. "Nutritional deficiencies are unrecognized in approximately 50% of patients who undergo gastric bypass surgery. The authors present some of the more common nutritional deficiencies and related complications that can occur in this patient population.")

- Secondary hyperparathyroidism due to inadequate absorption of calcium may occur in GBP patients. Calcium is primarily absorbed in the duodenum, which is bypassed by the surgery. Most patients can achieve adequate calcium absorption by supplementation with vitamin D and calcium citrate (carbonate may not be absorbed—it requires an acidic stomach, which is bypassed).
- Iron frequently is seriously deficient, particularly in menstruating females, and must be supplemented. Again, it is normally absorbed in the duodenum. Ferrous sulfate can cause considerable GI distress in normal doses; alternatives include ferrous fumarate, or a chelated form of iron. Occasionally, a female patient develops severe anemia, even with supplements, and must be treated with parenteral iron. The signs of iron deficiency include: brittle nails, an inflamed tongue, constipation, depression, headaches, fatigue, and mouth lesions. (Note: Poitou Bernert C, Ciangura C, Coupaye M, Czernichow S, Bouillot JL, Basdevant A (February 2007). "Nutritional deficiency after gastric bypass: diagnosis, prevention and treatment". Diabetes & Metabolism (Journal Article) (in English and French). 33 (1). French Society for the study of Diabetes: 13–24. doi:10.1016/j.diabet.2006.11.004. eISSN 1878-1780. OCLC 715912772. PMID 17258928.)
- Signs and symptoms of zinc deficiency may also occur such as acne, eczema, white spots on the nails, hair loss, depression, amnesia, and lethargy. (Note: Madan AK, Orth WS, Tichansky DS, Ternovits CA (May 2006). "Vitamin and trace mineral levels after laparoscopic gastric bypass". Obesity Surgery. 16 (5). Springer-Verlag: 603–6. doi:10.1381/096089206776945057. eISSN 1708-0428. LCCN 2001301458. OCLC 23835796. PMID 16687029. S2CID 31410788. "Nutritional deficiencies are a concern after any bariatric surgery procedure. Restriction of oral intake and/or decreased absorption may cause vitamin abnormalities. Prevention of these vitamin deficiencies includes both supplementation and routine measuring of serum values.")
- Deficiency of thiamine (also known as vitamin B_{1}) brings the risk of permanent neurological damage (i.e. Wernicke's encephalopathy or polyneuropathy). Signs of thiamin deficiency are heart failure, memory loss, numbness of the hands, constipation, and loss of appetite.
- Vitamin B_{12} requires intrinsic factor from the gastric mucosa to be absorbed. In patients with a small gastric pouch, it may not be absorbed, even if supplemented orally, and deficiencies can result in pernicious anemia and neuropathies. Vitamin B_{12} deficiency is quite common after gastric bypass surgery with reported rates of 30% in some clinical trials. Sublingual B_{12} (cyanocobalamin) appears to be adequately absorbed. In cases where sublingual B_{12} does not provide sufficient amounts, injections may be needed.
- Protein malnutrition is a real risk. Some patients experience troublesome vomiting after surgery, until their GI tract adjusts to the changes, and cannot eat adequate amounts even with 6 meals a day. Many patients require protein supplementation during the early phases of rapid weight loss to prevent excessive loss of muscle mass. Hair loss is also a risk of protein malnutrition.
- Vitamin A deficiencies generally occur as a result of fat-soluble vitamin deficiencies. This often comes after intestinal bypass procedures such as jejunoileal bypass (no longer performed) or biliopancreatic diversion/duodenal switch procedures. In these procedures, fat absorption is markedly impaired. There is also the possibility of a vitamin A deficiency with the use of the weight-loss medication orlistat (marketed as Xenical and Alli).
- Folate deficiency is also a common occurrence in gastric bypass surgery patients.

==== Nutritional effects ====
After surgery, patients feel fullness after ingesting only a small volume of food, followed soon thereafter by a sense of satiety and loss of appetite. Total food intake is markedly reduced. Due to the reduced size of the newly created stomach pouch, and reduced food intake, adequate nutrition demands that the patient follow the surgeon's instructions for food consumption, including the number of meals to be taken daily, adequate protein intake, and the use of vitamin and mineral supplements. Calcium supplements, iron supplements, protein supplements, multi-vitamins (sometimes prenatal vitamins are best), and vitamin B_{12} (cyanocobalamin) supplements are all very important to the post-operative bypass patient.

Total food intake and absorbance rate of food will rapidly decline after gastric bypass surgery, and the number of acid-producing cells lining the stomach increases. Doctors often prescribe acid-lowering medications to counteract the high acidity levels. Many patients then experience a condition known as achlorhydria, where there is not enough acid in the stomach. As a result of the low acidity levels, patients can develop an overgrowth of bacteria. A study conducted on 43 post-operative patients revealed that almost all of the patients tested positive for a hydrogen breath test, which indicated an overgrowth of bacteria in the small intestine. (Note: Adams TD, Avelar E, Cloward T, Crosby RD, Farney RJ, Gress R, et al. (October 2005). "Design and rationale of the Utah obesity study. A study to assess morbidity following gastric bypass surgery". Contemporary Clinical Trials (Journal Article). 26 (5). Elsevier: 534–51. doi:10.1016/j.cct.2005.05.003. eISSN 1559-2030. LCCN 80645055. OCLC 569090329. PMID 16046191.) Bacterial overgrowth causes the gut ecology to change and induces nausea and vomiting. Recurring nausea and vomiting eventually change the absorbance rate of food, contributing to the vitamin and nutrition deficiencies common in post-operative gastric bypass patients.

===== Protein nutrition =====
Proteins are essential food substances, contained in foods such as meat, fish, poultry, dairy products, eggs, vegetables, fruits, legumes, and nuts. With a reduced ability to eat a large volume of food, gastric bypass patients must focus on eating their protein requirements first, and with each meal. In some cases, surgeons may recommend the use of a liquid protein supplement. Powdered protein supplements added to smoothies or any food can be an important part of the post-op diet.

===== Calorie nutrition =====
The profound weight loss that occurs after bariatric surgery is due to taking in much less energy (calories) than the body needs to use every day. Fat tissue must be burned to offset the deficit, and weight loss results. Eventually, as the body becomes smaller, its energy requirements are decreased, while the patient simultaneously finds it possible to eat somewhat more food. When the energy consumed is equal to the calories eaten, weight loss will stop. Proximal GBP typically results in loss of 60–80% of excess body weight, and very rarely leads to excessive weight loss. The risk of excessive weight loss is slightly greater with distal GBP.

===== Vitamins =====
Vitamins are normally contained in foods and supplements. The amount of food eaten after GBP is severely reduced, and vitamin content is correspondingly lowered. Supplements should therefore be taken to complete minimum daily requirements of all vitamins and minerals. Pre-natal vitamins are sometimes suggested by doctors, as they contain more of certain vitamins than most multivitamins. Absorption of most vitamins is not seriously affected after proximal GBP, although vitamin B_{12} may not be well-absorbed in some persons: sublingual preparations of B_{12} provide adequate absorption. Some randomized studies suggest that GBP patients who took probiotics after surgery had higher postoperative vitamin B_{12} levels than patients who did not take probiotics. After a distal GBP, fat-soluble vitamins A, D, and E may not be well-absorbed, particularly if fat intake is large. Water-dispersed forms of these vitamins may be indicated on specific physician recommendations. For some patients, sublingual B_{12} is not enough, and patients may require B_{12} injections.

===== Minerals =====
All versions of the GBP bypass the duodenum, which is the primary site of absorption of both iron and calcium. Iron replacement is essential in menstruating females, and supplementation of iron and calcium is preferable in all patients. Ferrous sulfate is poorly tolerated. Alternative forms of iron (fumarate, gluconate, chelates) are less irritating and probably better absorbed. Calcium carbonate preparations should also be avoided; calcium as citrate or gluconate (with 1200 mg as calcium) has greater bioavailability independent of acid in the stomach, and will likely be better absorbed. Chewable calcium supplements that include vitamin K are sometimes recommended by doctors as a good way to get calcium.

===== Alcohol metabolism =====
Post-operative gastric bypass patients develop a lowered tolerance for alcoholic beverages because their altered digestive tract absorbs alcohol at a faster rate than people who have not undergone the surgery. It also takes a post-operative patient longer to reach sober levels after consuming alcohol. In a study conducted on 36 post-operative patients and a control group of 36 subjects (who had not undergone surgery), each subject drank a 5 oz. glass of red wine and had the alcohol in their breath measured to evaluate alcohol metabolism. The gastric bypass group had an average peak alcohol breath level of 0.08%, whereas the control group had an average peak alcohol breath level of 0.05%. It took an average of 108 minutes for the gastric bypass patients group to return to an alcohol breath of zero, while it took the control group an average of 72 minutes. (Note: Hagedorn JC, Encarnacion B, Brat GA, Morton JM (2007). "Does gastric bypass alter alcohol metabolism?". Surgery for Obesity and Related Diseases (Journal Article). 3 (5). Elsevier: 543–8, discussion 548. doi:10.1016/j.soard.2007.07.003. eISSN 1878-7533. OCLC 723554412. PMID 17903777.)

===== Pica =====
There have been reported cases in which pica recurs after gastric bypass in patients with a pre-operative history of the disorder, which is possibly due to iron deficiency. Pica is a compulsive tendency to eat substances other than normal food. Some examples would be people eating paper, clay, plaster, ashes, or ice. Low levels of iron and hemoglobin are common in patients who have undergone gastric bypass. One study reported on a female post-operative gastric bypass patient who was consuming eight to ten 32 oz. glasses of ice a day. The patient's blood test revealed iron levels of 2.3 mmol/L and hemoglobin level of 5.83 mmol/L. Normal iron blood levels of adult women are 30 to 126 μg/dL and normal hemoglobin levels are 12.1 to 15.1 g/dL. This deficiency in the patient's iron levels may have led to an increase in Pica activity. The patient was then given iron supplements that brought her hemoglobin and iron blood levels to normal levels. After one month, the patient's eating diminished to two to three glasses of ice per day. After one year of taking iron supplements the patient's iron and hemoglobin levels remained in a normal range and the patient reported that she did not have any further cravings for ice. (Note: Kushner RF, Gleason B, Shanta-Retelny V (September 2004). "Reemergence of pica following gastric bypass surgery for obesity: a new presentation of an old problem". Journal of the American Dietetic Association (Journal Article). 104 (9). Elsevier: 1393–7. doi:10.1016/j.jada.2004.06.026. OCLC 1113369764. PMID 15354156. "Pica, the compulsive ingestion of nonnutritive substances, has been a fascinating and poorly understood phenomenon for centuries. Pagophagia, or ice eating, is one of the most common forms of pica and is closely associated with the development of iron deficiency anemia. Although this condition has been well described among pregnant women and malnourished children, particularly in developing countries, it has not been previously reported to occur following gastric bypass surgery for the treatment of severe obesity. This article presents two cases of women who experienced a recurrence of pagophagia following gastric bypass surgery, along with an updated review of the literature.")

== Results and health benefits of gastric bypass ==
Weight loss of 65–80% of excess body weight is typical of most large series of gastric bypass operations reported. The medically more significant effects include a dramatic reduction in comorbid conditions:

- Hyperlipidemia is corrected in over 70% of patients.
- Essential hypertension is relieved in over 70% of patients, and medication requirements are usually reduced in the remainder.
- Obstructive sleep apnea improves markedly with weight loss and bariatric surgery may be curative for sleep apnea. Snoring is also reduced in most patients.
- Type 2 diabetes is reversed in up to 90% of patients usually leading to a normal blood-sugar level without medication, sometimes within days of surgery.

(Note: Pories WJ, Caro JF, Flickinger EG, Meelheim HD, Swanson MS (September 1987). "The control of diabetes mellitus (NIDDM) in the morbidly obese with the Greenville Gastric Bypass". Annals of Surgery (Journal Article). 206 (3). Lippincott Williams & Wilkins: 316–23. doi:10.1097/00000658-198709000-00009. eISSN 1528-1140. OCLC 676989143. PMC 1493167. PMID 3632094. "Abnormal glucose metabolism was present in 141 (36%) of 397 patients before surgery: NIDDM was present in 88 patients (22%) and 53 patients (14%) were glucose impaired. Of these, all but two became euglycemic within 4 months after surgery without any diabetic medication or special diets.") (Note: Pories WJ, Swanson MS, MacDonald KG, Long SB, Morris PG, Brown BM, et al. (September 1995). "Who would have thought it? An operation proves to be the most effective therapy for adult-onset diabetes mellitus". Annals of Surgery (Journal Article). 222 (3). Lippincott Williams & Wilkins: 339–50, discussion 350–2. doi:10.1097/00000658-199509000-00011. eISSN 1528-1140. OCLC 866946233. PMC 1234815. PMID 7677463.) Furthermore, Type 2 diabetes is prevented by more than 30-fold in patients with pre-diabetes. All these findings were first reported by Walter Pories and Jose F. Caro.

- Gastroesophageal reflux disease is relieved in almost all patients.
- Venous thromboembolic disease signs such as leg swelling are typically alleviated.
- Lower-back pain and joint pain are typically relieved or improved in nearly all patients.

A study in a large prospective study of 2010 obese patients showed a 29% reduction in mortality up to 15 years following surgery (hazard ratio 0.71 when adjusted for sex, age, and risk factors), compared to a non-surgically treated group of 2037 patients. A meta-analysis of 174772 participants published in The Lancet in 2021 found that bariatric surgery was associated with 59% and 30% reduction in all-cause mortality among obese adults with or without type 2 diabetes, respectively. This meta-analysis also found that median life expectancy was 9.3 years longer for obese adults with diabetes who received bariatric surgery as compared to routine (non-surgical) care, whereas the life expectancy gain was 5.1 years longer for obese adults without diabetes.

Concurrently, most patients can enjoy greater participation in family and social activities.

== Cost of gastric bypass ==
The patient's out-of-pocket cost for Roux-en-Y gastric bypass surgery varies widely depending on the method of payment, region, surgical practice, and hospital in which the procedure is performed.

Methods of payment in the United States include private insurance, such as Individual & Family coverage, Small Group coverage through an employer (Under 50 full-time employees) and Large Group coverage through an employer (50 or more full-time employees), public insurance (Medicare and Medicaid) and self-pay. Out-of-pocket costs for a patient with private or public insurance that specifically lists bariatric surgery as a covered benefit include several insurance-policy-specific parameters such as deductible levels, coinsurance percentages, copay amounts and out-of-pocket limits.

Patients without insurance must pay for surgery directly (or through a third-party lender), and total out-of-pocket costs will depend on the surgical practice they choose and the hospital in which the surgical practice performs the procedure. On average, the total cost of gastric bypass surgery is about $24,000 in the United States, although on a state-specific level it ranges from an average of $15,000 (Arkansas) to an average of $57,000 (Alaska).

In Germany a gastric bypass operation, if not covered by health insurance and therefore paid privately, costs up to €15,000; in Switzerland CHF 20,000–25,000, in Poland gastric bypass costs around £4,000, whereas in Turkey it costs £3,200.

== Living with gastric bypass ==
Gastric bypass surgery has an emotional and physiological impact on the individual. Many who have undergone the surgery develop depression in the following months as a result of a change in the role food plays in their emotional well-being. (Note: Elkins G, Whitfield P, Marcus J, Symmonds R, Rodriguez J, Cook T (April 2005). "Noncompliance with behavioral recommendations following bariatric surgery". Obesity Surgery (Journal Article). 15 (4). Springer-Verlag: 546–51. doi:10.1381/0960892053723385. eISSN 1708-0428. LCCN 2001301458. OCLC 23835796. PMID 15946436. S2CID 12924412.) Strict limitations on the diet can place great emotional strain on the patient. Energy levels in the period following the surgery can be low, both due to the restriction of food intake and negative changes in emotional state. (Note: Delin CR, Watts JM, Saebel JL, Anderson PG (October 1997). "Eating behavior and the experience of hunger following gastric bypass surgery for morbid obesity". Obesity Surgery (Journal Article). 7 (5). Springer-Verlag: 405–13. doi:10.1381/096089297765555386. eISSN 1708-0428. LCCN 2001301458. OCLC 23835796. PMID 9730494. S2CID 43501262.) It may take as long as three months for emotional levels to rebound.

Muscular weakness in the months following surgery is also common. This is caused by many factors, including a restriction on protein intake, a resulting loss in muscle mass, and a decline in energy levels. Muscle weakness may result in balance problems, difficulty climbing stairs or lifting heavy objects, and increased fatigue following simple physical tasks. Many of these issues pass over time as food intake gradually increases. However, the first months following the surgery can be very difficult, an issue not often mentioned by physicians suggesting the surgery. The benefits and risks of this surgery are well established; however, the psychological effects are not well understood.

Even if physical activity is increased, patients may still harbor long-term psychological effects due to excess skin and fat. Often bypass surgery is followed up with "body lifts" of skin and liposuction of fatty deposits. These extra surgeries have inherent risks but are even more dangerous when coupled with the typical nutritional deficiencies that accompany convalescing gastric bypass patients.

== Surgeon accreditation ==
The American Society for Metabolic & Bariatric Surgery lists bariatric programs and surgeons in its "Centers of Excellence" network, while the American College of Surgeons accredits providers through its Bariatric Surgery Center Network. For listings of surgeons and centers in other countries, the International Federation for the Surgery of Obesity and Metabolic Disorders lists medical associations by country.

== See also ==
- Adjustable gastric band
- Duodenal switch surgery
- Ileal interposition
- StomaphyX—Revisional, natural orifice procedure for patients that have regained weight after gastric bypass
- Vagotomy—Cutting of the vagus nerve to reduce the feeling of hunger
